= MSER =

MSER may refer to

- Maximally stable extremal regions, a method of blob detection in images
- Materials Science and Engineering R: Reports, a journal in materials science
