= Biomaterials (journal) =

- Discipline: Materials science, biomedical engineering
- Language: English
- Edited by: Kam W. Leong

Publication details
- Former name: Clinical Materials
- History: 1980–present
- Publisher: Elsevier
- Frequency: 38/year
- Impact factor: 13.6 (2025)

Standard abbreviations
- ISO 4: Biomaterials

Indexing
- CODEN: BIMADU
- ISSN: 0142-9612
- LCCN: 84641712
- OCLC no.: 612263690

Links
- Journal homepage; Online access; Online archive

Biomaterials is a peer-reviewed scientific journal covering research on and applications of biomaterials. It is published by Elsevier. The editor-in-chief is Kam W. Leong (Columbia University) and David Williams is an honorary editor. The journal was established in 1980.

== Abstracting and indexing ==
The journal is abstracted and indexed in:

- Biological Abstracts
- BIOSIS Previews
- CAB Abstracts
- Chemical Abstracts Service
- Current Contents/Life Sciences
- EBSCO databases
- Ei Compendex
- Elsevier Biobase
- Embase
- Index Medicus/MEDLINE/PubMed
- Inspec
- METADEX
- Science Citation Index
- Scopus

According to the Journal Citation Reports, the journal has a 2025 impact factor of 13.6.

== See also ==
- Materials Today
- Acta Biomaterialia
- Materials Science and Engineering C
