= Materials Science and Engineering =

Materials Science and Engineering may refer to several journals in the field of materials science and engineering:

- Materials Science and Engineering A
- Materials Science and Engineering B
- Materials Science and Engineering C
- Materials Science and Engineering R, reviews
