= COSFIRE =

Trainable filter for computer vision

COSFIRE stands for Combination Of Shifted FIlter REsponses.

COSFIRE is a trainable filter, which can be used for interest point (keypoint) detection and pattern recognition in the field of computer vision.
