= Materials Science and Engineering B =

- Discipline: Materials science
- Language: English
- Edited by: J. Xia

Publication details
- Publisher: Elsevier
- Impact factor: 5.7 (2025)

Standard abbreviations
- ISO 4: Mater. Sci. Eng. B

Indexing
- ISSN: 0921-5107

Links
- Journal homepage

Materials Science and Engineering: B — Advanced Functional Solid-State Materials is a peer-reviewed scientific journal. It is the section of Materials Science and Engineering dedicated to "calculation, synthesis, processing, characterization, and understanding of advanced quantum materials" and is published monthly by Elsevier. It aims at providing a leading international forum for material researchers across the disciplines of theory, experiment, and device applications. The current editor-in-chief is Jing Xia (University of California Irvine).

According to the Journal Citation Reports, the journal has a 2025 impact factor of 5.7.
