= Materials Science and Engineering A =

- Discipline: Materials science
- Language: English
- Edited by: H. W. Hahn, E. J. Lavernia, & B. B. Wei

Publication details
- History: 1993–present
- Publisher: Elsevier
- Frequency: Monthly
- Impact factor: 7.9 (2025)

Standard abbreviations
- ISO 4: Mater. Sci. Eng. A

Indexing
- ISSN: 0921-5093

Links
- Journal homepage; Online access

Materials Science and Engineering: A — Structural Materials: Properties, Microstructure and Processing is a peer-reviewed scientific journal. It is the section of Materials Science and Engineering dedicated to "theoretical and experimental studies related to the load-bearing capacity of materials as influenced by their basic properties, processing history, microstructure and operating environment" and is published monthly by Elsevier. The current editor-in-chiefs are H. W. Hahn (University of Oklahoma), E. J. Lavernia (Texas A&M University), and B. B. Wei (Northwestern Polytechnical University).

== Abstracting and indexing ==
The journal is indexed and abstracted in the following bibliographic databases:

Science Citation Index Expanded
- Academic Search Premier
- Chemical Abstracts Core
- Civil Engineering Abstracts
- Communication Abstracts
- INSPEC
- Metadex
- PASCAL
- Scopus

According to the Journal Citation Reports, the journal has a 2025 impact factor of 7.9.
