= Materials Science and Engineering R: Reports =

- Discipline: Materials science
- Language: English
- Edited by: Franky So

Publication details
- History: 1993-present
- Publisher: Elsevier
- Frequency: Monthly
- Impact factor: 21.1 (2025)

Standard abbreviations
- ISO 4: Mater. Sci. Eng. R Rep.

Indexing
- ISSN: 0927-796X
- LCCN: 99111571
- OCLC no.: 28356512

Links
- Journal homepage; Online access

Materials Science and Engineering R: Reports is a monthly peer-reviewed scientific journal. It is the review section of Materials Science and Engineering and is published by Elsevier. It was established in 1993, when the journal Materials Science Reports was split into Materials Science and Engineering C and Materials Science and Engineering R: Reports.

According to the Journal Citation Reports, Materials Science and Engineering R: Reports has a 2025 impact factor of 21.1.
