= Materials Science and Engineering C =

- Discipline: Materials science
- Language: English
- Edited by: Manuel Salmeron-Sanchez

Publication details
- History: 1993–present
- Publisher: Elsevier
- Frequency: Monthly
- Impact factor: 7.328 (2020)

Standard abbreviations
- ISO 4: Mater. Sci. Eng. C

Indexing
- ISSN: 0928-4931

Links
- Journal homepage; Online access

Materials Science and Engineering: C was a peer-reviewed scientific journal that has since been renamed to Biomaterials Advances.

According to the Journal Citation Reports, the journal had a 2020 impact factor of 7.328.
