= Separable filter =

Image-processing filter decomposable into two 1D filters

A separable filter in image processing can be written as the product of two or more simple filters. Typically a 2-dimensional convolution operation is separated into two 1-dimensional filters. This reduces the computational costs on an $N\times M$ image with a $m\times n$ filter from $\mathcal{O}(M\cdot N\cdot m\cdot n)$ down to $\mathcal{O}(M\cdot N\cdot (m + n))$.

== Examples ==
1. A two-dimensional smoothing filter:

$$\frac{1}{3}
\begin{bmatrix}
1 \\ 1 \\ 1
\end{bmatrix}
*
\frac{1}{3}
\begin{bmatrix}
1 & 1 & 1
\end{bmatrix}
=
\frac{1}{9}
\begin{bmatrix}
1 & 1 & 1 \\
1 & 1 & 1 \\
1 & 1 & 1
\end{bmatrix}$$

2. Another two-dimensional smoothing filter with stronger weight in the middle:

$$\frac{1}{4}
\begin{bmatrix}
1 \\ 2 \\ 1
\end{bmatrix}
*
\frac{1}{4}
\begin{bmatrix}
1 & 2 & 1
\end{bmatrix}
=
\frac{1}{16}
\begin{bmatrix}
1 & 2 & 1 \\
2 & 4 & 2 \\
1 & 2 & 1
\end{bmatrix}$$

3. The Sobel operator, used commonly for edge detection:

$$\begin{bmatrix}
1 \\ 2 \\ 1
\end{bmatrix}
*
\begin{bmatrix}
1 & 0 & -1
\end{bmatrix}
=
\begin{bmatrix}
1 & 0 & -1 \\
2 & 0 & -2 \\
1 & 0 & -1
\end{bmatrix}$$

This works also for the Prewitt operator.

In the examples, there is a cost of 3 multiply–accumulate operations for each vector which gives six total (horizontal and vertical). This is compared to the nine operations for the full 3x3 matrix.

Another notable example of a separable filter is the Gaussian blur whose performance can be greatly improved the bigger the convolution window becomes.
