= Robinson compass mask =

In image processing, a Robinson compass mask is a type of compass mask used for edge detection. It has eight major compass orientations, each will extract the edges in respect to its direction. A combined use of compass masks of different directions could detect the edges from different angles.

== Technical explanation ==
The Robinson compass mask is defined by taking a single mask and rotating it to form eight orientations:
$$\text{North:}\begin{bmatrix}
-1 & 0 & 1 \\
-2 & 0 & 2 \\
-1 & 0 & 1
\end{bmatrix}$$
$$\text{North West:}\begin{bmatrix}
0 & 1 & 2 \\
-1 & 0 & 1 \\
-2 & -1 & 0
\end{bmatrix}$$
$$\text{West:}\begin{bmatrix}
1 & 2 & 1 \\
0 & 0 & 0 \\
-1 & -2 & -1
\end{bmatrix}$$
$$\text{South West:}\begin{bmatrix}
2 & 1 & 0 \\
1 & 0 & -1 \\
0 & -1 & -2
\end{bmatrix}$$
$$\text{South:}\begin{bmatrix}
1 & 0 & -1 \\
2 & 0 & -2 \\
1 & 0 & -1
\end{bmatrix}$$
$$\text{South East:}\begin{bmatrix}
0 & -1 & -2 \\
1 & 0 & -1 \\
2 & 1 & 0
\end{bmatrix}$$
$$\text{East:}\begin{bmatrix}
-1 & -2 & -1 \\
0 & 0 & 0 \\
1 & 2 & 1
\end{bmatrix}$$
$$\text{North East:}\begin{bmatrix}
-2 & -1 & 0 \\
-1 & 0 & 1 \\
0 & 1 & 2
\end{bmatrix}$$

The direction axis is the line of zeros in the matrix. Robinson compass mask is similar to kirsch compass masks, but is simpler to implement. Since the matrix coefficients only contains 0, 1, 2, and are symmetrical, only the results of four masks need to be calculated, the other four results are the negation of the first four results. An edge, or contour is an tiny area with neighboring distinct pixel values. The convolution of each mask with the image would create a high value output where there is a rapid change of pixel value, thus an edge point is found. All the detected edge points would line up as edges.

== Example ==
An example of Robinson compass masks applied to the original image. Obviously, the edges in the direction of the mask is enhanced.

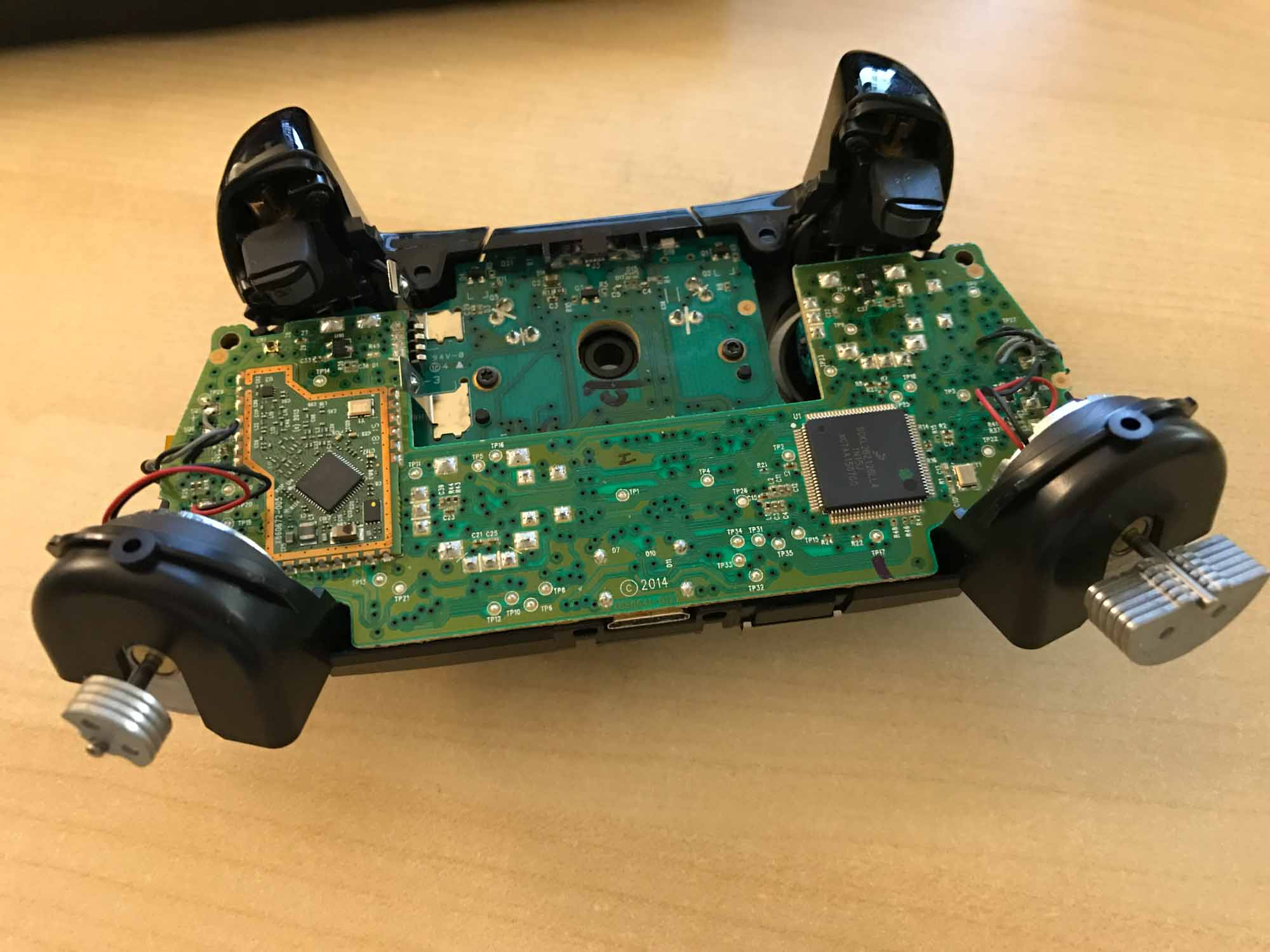
original_image

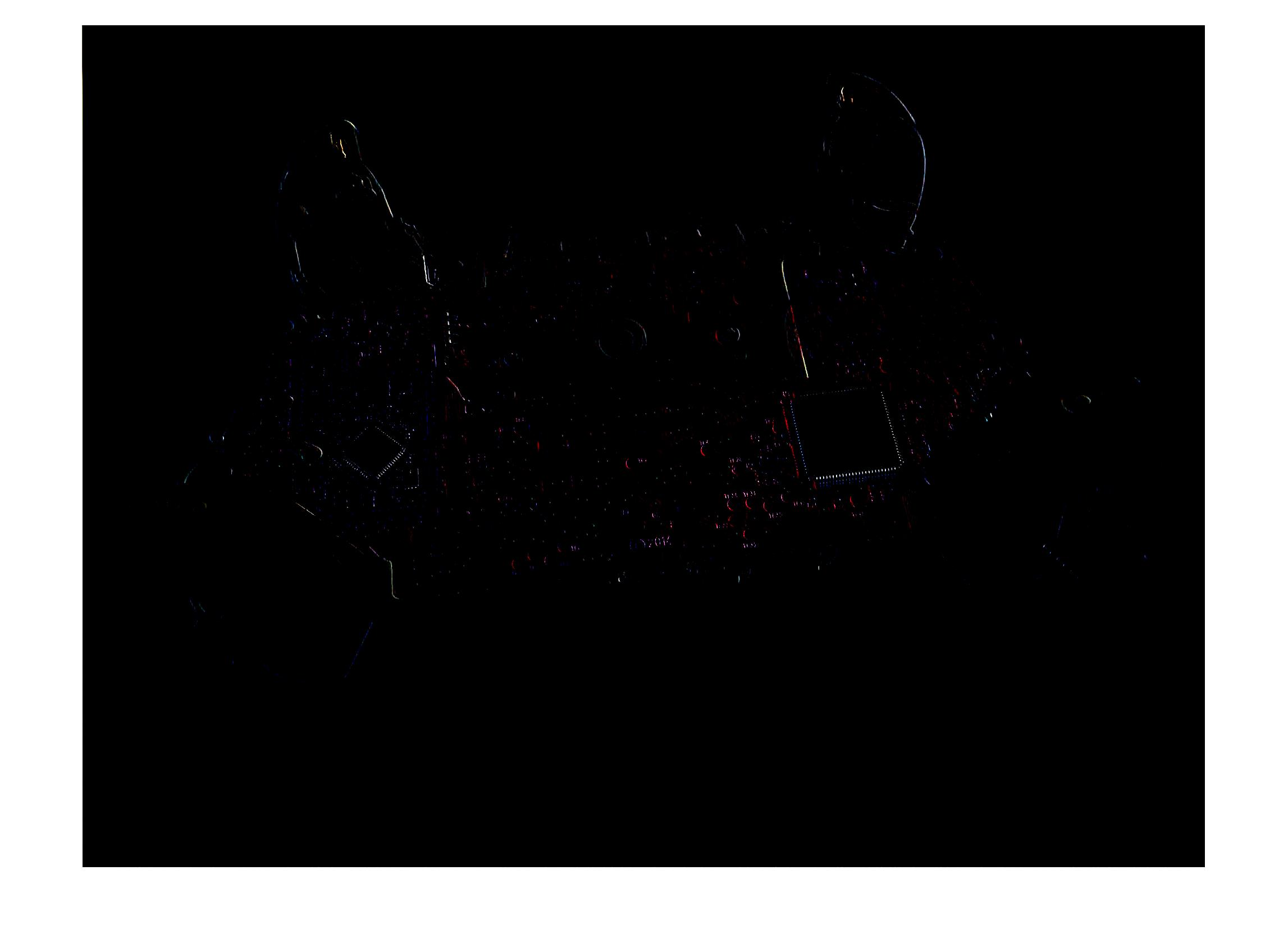
Robinson North Mask

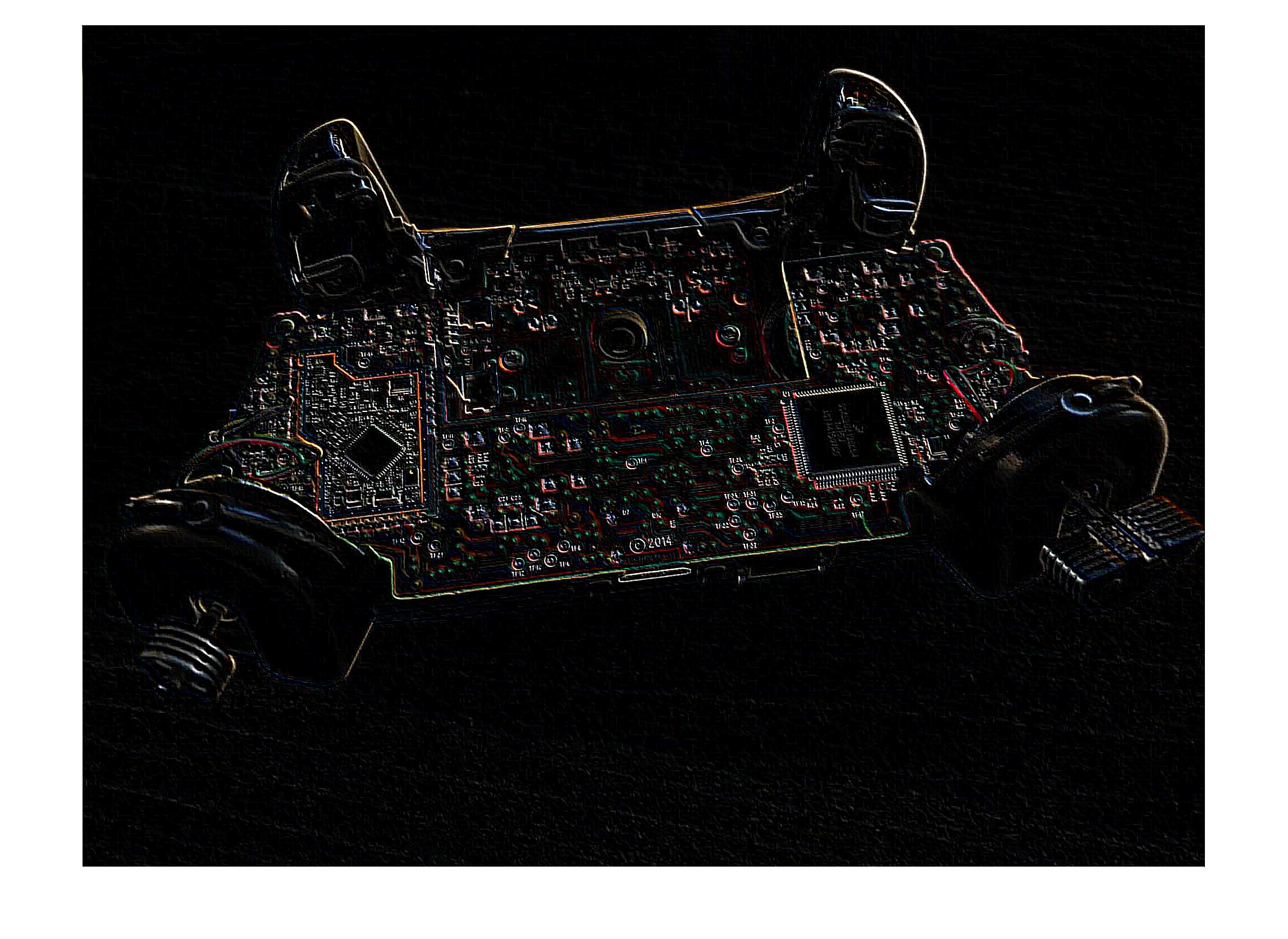
Robinson NorthWest Mask

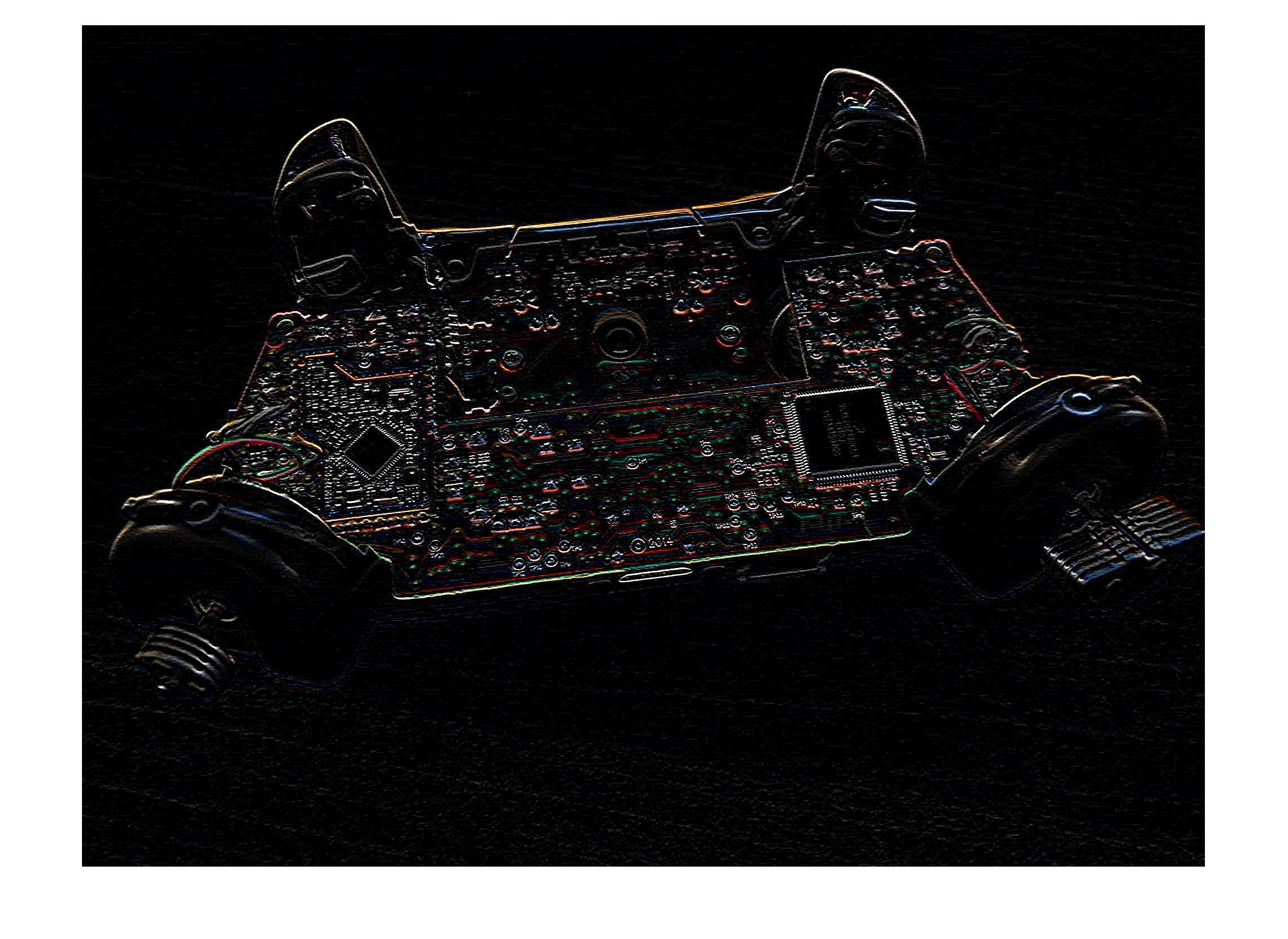
Robinson West Mask

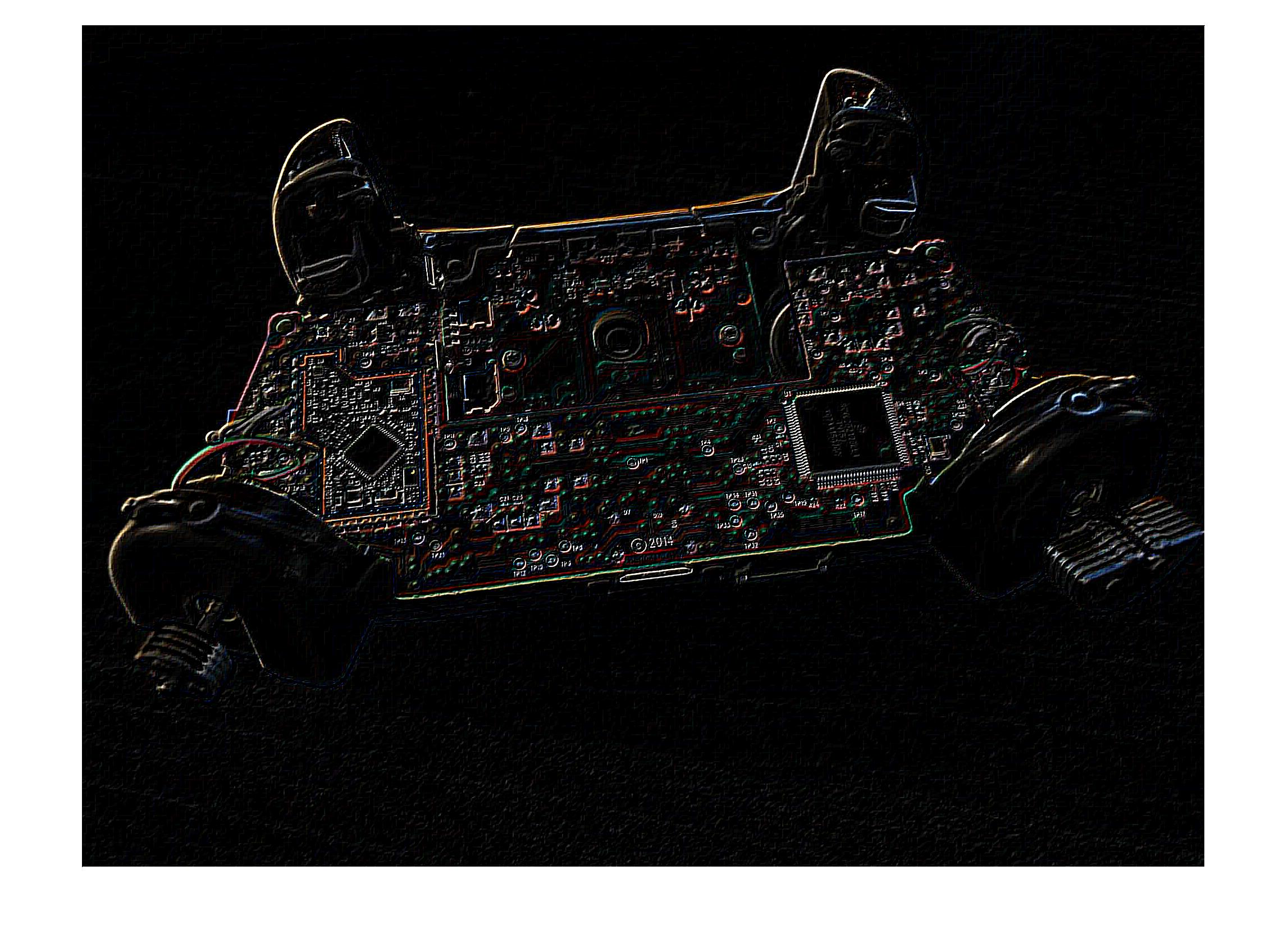
Robinson SouthWest Mask

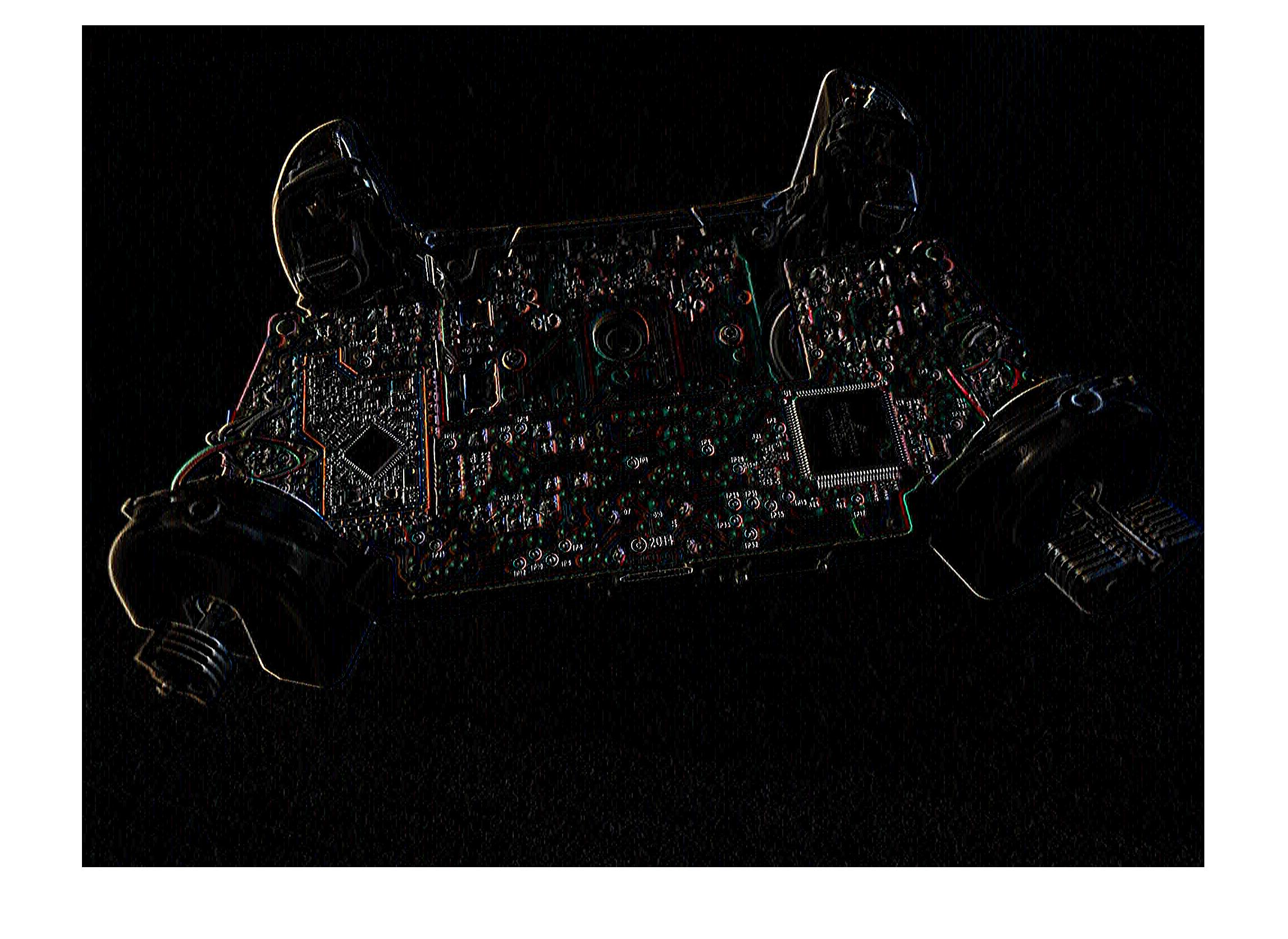
Robinson South Mask

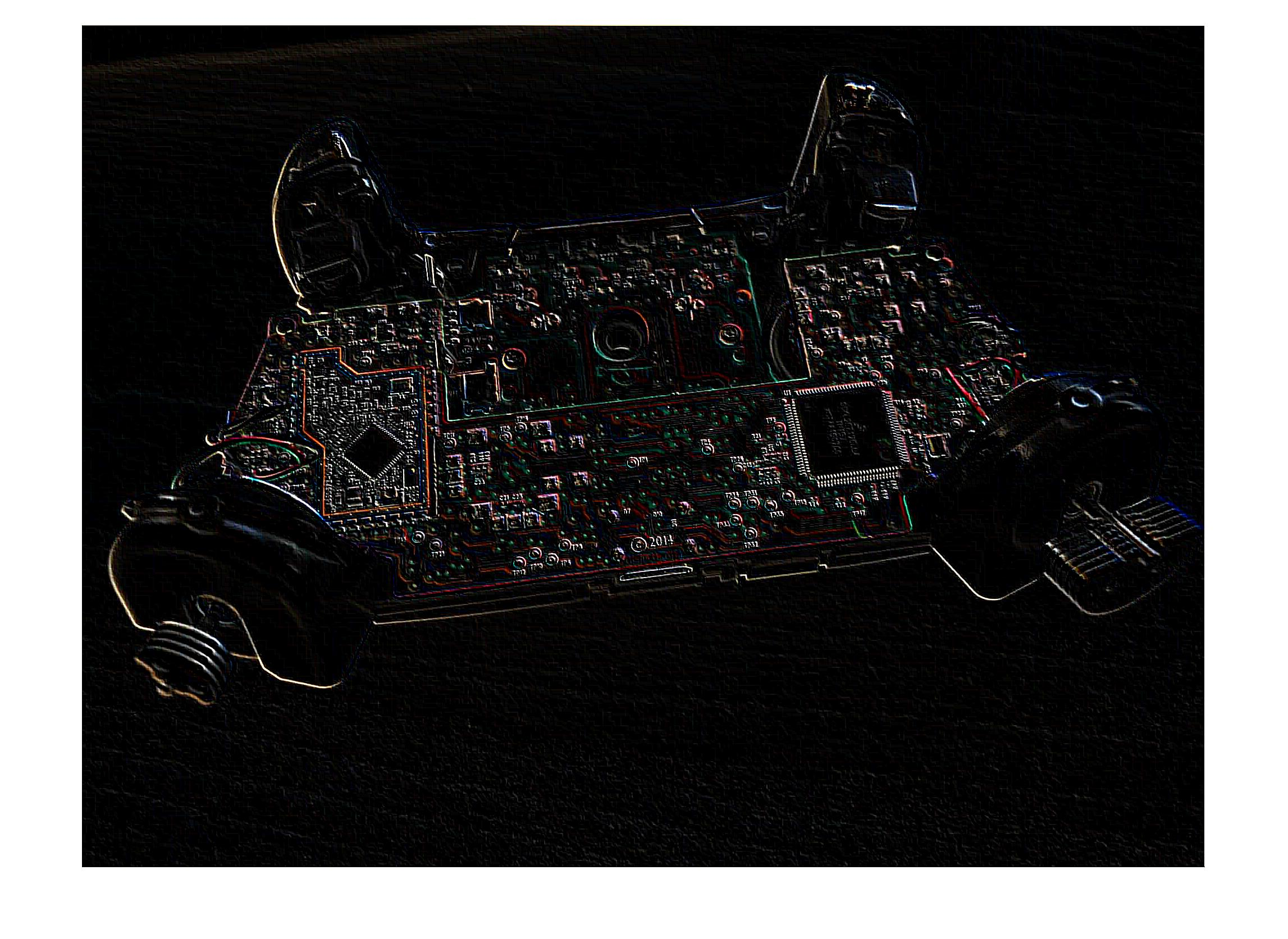
Robinson SouthEast Mask

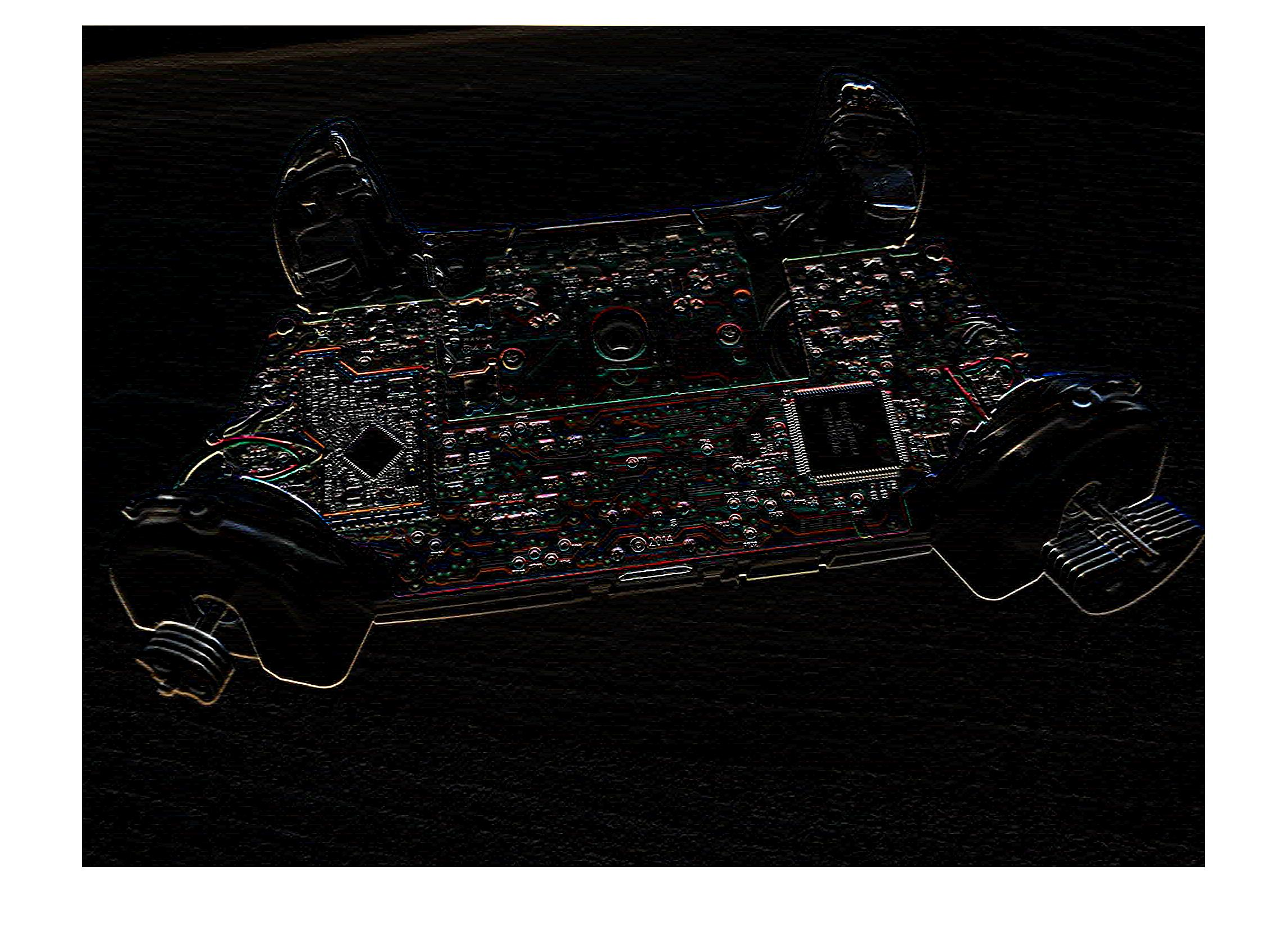
Robinson East Mask

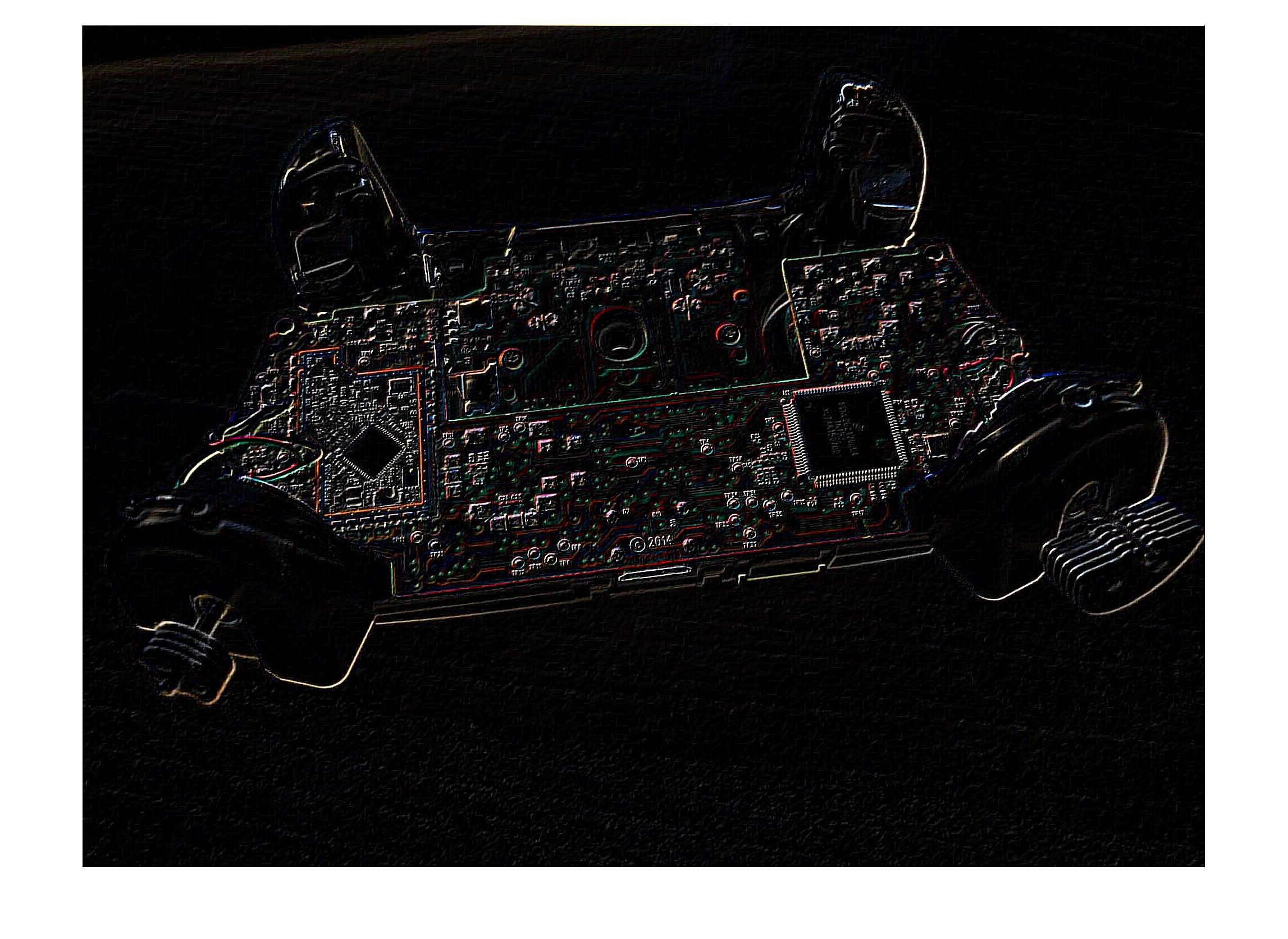
Robinson NorthEast Mask
