= Irwin Sobel =

American computer scientist

- Born: Irwin Sobel; September 12, 1940; New York City
- Education: MIT
- Occupation: Scientist
- Spouse: Ceevah Sobel
- Writing career
- Notable work: Sobel operator (1968)

Irwin Sobel (born September 12, 1940) is a scientist and researcher in digital image processing.

== Biography ==
Irwin Sobel was born in New York City. He graduated from MIT in 1961 and completed his Ph.D. research at the Stanford Artificial Intelligence Project (SAIL) with thesis Camera Models and Machine Perception. His Ph.D. advisor was Jerome A. Feldman.

Starting in 1973, he spent nine years doing postdoctoral research at Columbia University. After 1982, he worked as a Senior Researcher at HP Labs.

== Sobel operator ==
In 1968, Sobel gave a talk entitled "An Isotropic 3x3 Image Gradient Operator" at SAIL; this method became known as the Sobel operator. It was developed jointly with a colleague, Gary Feldman, also at SAIL.
