= Multi-scale approaches =

The scale space representation of a signal obtained by Gaussian smoothing satisfies a number of special properties, scale-space axioms, which make it into a special form of multi-scale representation. There are, however, also other types of "multi-scale approaches" in the areas of computer vision, image processing and signal processing, in particular the notion of wavelets. The purpose of this article is to describe a few of these approaches:

== Scale-space theory for one-dimensional signals ==
For one-dimensional signals, there exists quite a well-developed theory for continuous and discrete kernels that guarantee that new local extrema or zero-crossings cannot be created by a convolution operation. For continuous signals, it holds that all scale-space kernels can be decomposed into the following sets of primitive smoothing kernels:

- the Gaussian kernel :$g(x, t) = \frac{1}{\sqrt{2 \pi t}} \exp({-x^2/2 t})$ where $t > 0$,
- truncated exponential kernels (filters with one real pole in the s-plane):

$h(x)= \exp({-a x})$ if $x \geq 0$ and 0 otherwise where $a > 0$
$h(x)= \exp({b x})$ if $x \leq 0$ and 0 otherwise where $b > 0$,

- translations,
- rescalings.

For discrete signals, we can, up to trivial translations and rescalings, decompose any discrete scale-space kernel into the following primitive operations:

- the discrete Gaussian kernel

$T(n, t) = I_n(\alpha t)$ where $\alpha, t > 0$ where $I_n$ are the modified Bessel functions of integer order,

- generalized binomial kernels corresponding to linear smoothing of the form

$f_{out}(x) = p f_{in}(x) + q f_{in}(x-1)$ where $p, q > 0$
$f_{out}(x) = p f_{in}(x) + q f_{in}(x+1)$ where $p, q > 0$,

- first-order recursive filters corresponding to linear smoothing of the form

$f_{out}(x) = f_{in}(x) + \alpha f_{out}(x-1)$ where $\alpha > 0$
$f_{out}(x) = f_{in}(x) + \beta f_{out}(x+1)$ where $\beta > 0$,

- the one-sided Poisson kernel

$p(n, t) = e^{-t} \frac{t^n}{n!}$ for $n \geq 0$ where $t\geq0$
$p(n, t) = e^{-t} \frac{t^{-n}}{(-n)!}$ for $n \leq 0$ where $t\geq0$.

From this classification, it is apparent that we require a continuous semi-group structure, there are only three classes of scale-space kernels with a continuous scale parameter; the Gaussian kernel which forms the scale-space of continuous signals, the discrete Gaussian kernel which forms the scale-space of discrete signals and the time-causal Poisson kernel that forms a temporal scale-space over discrete time. If we on the other hand sacrifice the continuous semi-group structure, there are more options:

For discrete signals, the use of generalized binomial kernels provides a formal basis for defining the smoothing operation in a pyramid. For temporal data, the one-sided truncated exponential kernels and the first-order recursive filters provide a way to define time-causal scale-spaces that allow for efficient numerical implementation and respect causality over time without access to the future. The first-order recursive filters also provide a framework for defining recursive approximations to the Gaussian kernel that in a weaker sense preserve some of the scale-space properties.

== See also ==
- Scale space
- Scale space implementation
- Scale-space segmentation
