= Weierstrass transform =

"Smoothing" integral transform

In mathematics, the Weierstrass transform of a function $f : \mathbb{R} \to \mathbb{R}$, named after Karl Weierstrass, is a "smoothed" version of $f(x)$ obtained by averaging the values of $f$, weighted with a Gaussian centered at $x$.

Specifically, it is the function $F$ defined by
$$F(x) = \int\limits_{-\infty}^\infty f(y) e^{-\frac{(x-y)^2}{4}} \frac{dy}{\sqrt{4\pi}} =
\int\limits_{-\infty}^\infty f(x - y) e^{-\frac{y^2}{4}} \frac{dy}{\sqrt{4\pi}},$$
which is the convolution of $f$ with the Gaussian function, $e^{-x^2/4}/\sqrt{4\pi}.$

The graph of a function $f(x)$ (black) and its generalized Weierstrass transforms for five $t$ parameters. The standard Weierstrass transform $F(x)$ is given by the case $t = 1$ (in green).

The factor $(4\pi)^{-1/2}$ is chosen so that the Gaussian will have a total integral of 1, with the consequence that constant functions are not changed by the Weierstrass transform.

Instead of $F(x)$, one also writes $W[f](x)$. Note that $F(x)$ need not exist for every real number $x$, when the defining integral fails to converge.

The Weierstrass transform is intimately related to the heat equation (or, equivalently, the diffusion equation with constant diffusion coefficient). If the function $f$ describes the initial temperature at each point of an infinitely long rod that has constant thermal conductivity equal to 1, then the temperature distribution of the rod $t = 1$ time units later will be given by the function $F$. By using values of $t$ different from 1, we can define the generalized Weierstrass transform of $f$.

The generalized Weierstrass transform provides a means to approximate a given integrable function $f$ arbitrarily well with analytic functions.

== Names ==
Weierstrass used this transform in his original proof of the Weierstrass approximation theorem. It is also known as the Gauss transform or Gauss–Weierstrass transform, after Carl Friedrich Gauss, and as the Hille transform, after Einar Carl Hille, who studied it extensively. The generalization $W_t$ mentioned below is known in signal analysis as a Gaussian filter and in image processing (when implemented on $\mathbb{R}^2$) as a Gaussian blur.

== Transforms of some important functions ==
=== Constant functions ===
Every constant function is its own Weierstrass transform.

=== Polynomials ===
The Weierstrass transform of any polynomial is a polynomial of the same degree, and in fact has the same leading coefficient (the asymptotic growth is unchanged). Indeed, if $H_n$ denotes the (physicist's) Hermite polynomial of degree $n$, then the Weierstrass transform of $H_n(x/2)$ is simply $x^n$. This can be shown by exploiting the fact that the generating function for the Hermite polynomials is closely related to the Gaussian kernel used in the definition of the Weierstrass transform.

=== Exponentials, sines, and cosines ===
The Weierstrass transform of the exponential function $x \mapsto \exp(ax)$ (where $a$ is an arbitrary constant) is $x \mapsto \exp(a^2) \exp(ax)$. The function $\exp(ax)$ is thus an eigenfunction of the Weierstrass transform, with eigenvalue $\exp(a^2)$. (Note: More generally, $x \mapsto \exp(ax)$ is an eigenfunction for any convolution transforms.)

Using Weierstrass transform of $x \mapsto \exp(ax)$ with $a = bi$, where $b$ is an arbitrary real constant and $i$ is the imaginary unit, and applying Euler's identity, one sees that the Weierstrass transform of the function $\cos(bx)$ is $\exp(-b^2) \cos(bx)$, and the Weierstrass transform of the function $\sin(bx)$ is $\exp(-b^2) \sin(bx)$.

=== Gaussian functions ===
The Weierstrass transform of the function $x \mapsto \exp(ax^2)$ is
$$F(x) = \begin{cases}
\dfrac{1}{\sqrt{1 - 4a}} \exp\left(\dfrac{ax^2}{1 - 4a}\right) & \text{if } a < 1/4, \\
\text{undefined} & \text{if } a \geq 1/4.
\end{cases}$$
Of particular note is when $a$ is chosen to be negative. If $a < 0$, then $\exp(ax^2)$ is a Gaussian function, and its Weierstrass transform is also a Gaussian function, but a "wider" one.

== General properties ==
The Weierstrass transform assigns to each function $f$ a new function $F$; this assignment is linear. It is also translation-invariant, meaning that the transform of the function $f(x + a)$ is $F(x + a)$. Both of these facts are more generally true for any integral transform defined via convolution.

If the transform $F(x)$ exists for the real numbers $x = a$ and $x = b$, then it also exists for all real values in between and forms an analytic function there; moreover, $F(x)$ exists for all complex values of $x$ with $a \le \Re(x) \le b$ and forms a holomorphic function on that strip of the complex plane. This is the formal statement of the "smoothness" of $F$ mentioned above.

If $f$ is integrable over the whole real axis (i.e. $f \in L^1(\R)$), then so is its Weierstrass transform $F$, and if furthermore $f(x) \ge 0$ for all $x$, then also $F(x) \ge 0$ for all $x$, and the integrals of $f$ and $F$ are equal. This expresses the physical fact that the total thermal energy or heat is conserved by the heat equation, or that the total amount of diffusing material is conserved by the diffusion equation.

Using the above, one can show that for $1 \le p \le +\infty$ and $f \in L^p(\R)$, we have $F \in L^p(\R)$ and $\|F\|_p \le \|f\|_p$. The Weierstrass transform consequently yields a bounded operator $W : L^p(\R) \to L^p(\R)$.

If $f$ is sufficiently smooth, then the Weierstrass transform of the $k$-th derivative of $f$ is equal to the $k$-th derivative of the Weierstrass transform of $f$.

There is a formula relating the Weierstrass transform W and the two-sided Laplace transform $L$. If we define
$$g(x) = e^{-\frac{x^2}{4}} f(x),$$
then
$$W[f](x) = \frac{1}{\sqrt{4\pi}} e^{-x^2/4} L[g]\left(-\frac{x}{2}\right).$$

=== Low-pass filter ===
We have seen above that the Weierstrass transform of $\cos(bx)$ is $e^{-b^2} \cos(bx)$, and analogously for $\sin(bx)$. In terms of signal analysis, this suggests that if the signal $f$ contains the frequency $b$ (i.e. contains a summand which is a combination of $\sin(bx)$ and $\cos(bx)$), then the transformed signal $F$ will contain the same frequency, but with an amplitude multiplied by the factor $e^{-b^2}$. This has the consequence that higher frequencies are reduced more than lower ones, and the Weierstrass transform thus acts as a low-pass filter. This can also be shown with the continuous Fourier transform, as follows. The Fourier transform analyzes a signal in terms of its frequencies, transforms convolutions into products, and transforms Gaussians into Gaussians. The Weierstrass transform is convolution with a Gaussian and is therefore multiplication of the Fourier-transformed signal with a Gaussian, followed by application of the inverse Fourier transform. This multiplication with a Gaussian in frequency space blends out high frequencies, which is another way of describing the "smoothing" property of the Weierstrass transform.

== The inverse transform ==
The following formula, closely related to the Laplace transform of a Gaussian function, and a real analogue to the Hubbard–Stratonovich transformation, is relatively easy to establish:
$$e^{u^2} = \frac{1}{\sqrt{4\pi}} \int_{-\infty}^\infty e^{-uy} e^{-y^2/4} \,dy.$$

Now replace u with the formal differentiation operator D = d/dx and use the Lagrange shift operator
$$e^{-yD}f(x) = f(x - y)$$
(a consequence of the Taylor series formula and the definition of the exponential function) to obtain
$$\begin{align}
e^{D^2} f(x) &= \frac{1}{\sqrt{4\pi}} \int_{-\infty}^\infty e^{-yD}f(x) e^{-y^2/4} \,dy \\
&= \frac{1}{\sqrt{4\pi}} \int_{-\infty}^\infty f(x-y) e^{-y^2/4} \,dy = W[f](x),
\end{align}$$
thus obtaining the following formal expression for the Weierstrass transform $W$:

$W = e^{D^2},$

where the operator on the right is to be understood as acting on the function f(x) as
$$e^{D^2} f(x) = \sum_{k=0}^\infty \frac{D^{2k}f(x)}{k!}.$$

The above formal derivation glosses over details of convergence, and the formula $W = e^{D^2}$ is thus not universally valid; there are several functions $f$ which have a well-defined Weierstrass transform, but for which $e^{D^2}(f)$ cannot be meaningfully defined.

Nevertheless, the rule is still quite useful and can, for example, be used to derive the Weierstrass transforms of polynomials, exponential and trigonometric functions mentioned above.

The formal inverse of the Weierstrass transform is thus given by
$$W^{-1} = e^{-D^2}.$$
Again, this formula is not universally valid but can serve as a guide. It can be shown to be correct for certain classes of functions if the right-hand-side operator is properly defined.

One may alternatively attempt to invert the Weierstrass transform in a slightly different way: given the analytic function
$$F(x) = \sum_{n=0}^\infty a_n x^n,$$
apply $W^{-1}$ to obtain
$$f(x) = W^{-1}[F(x)] = \sum_{n=0}^\infty a_n W^{-1}[x^n] = \sum_{n=0}^\infty a_n H_n(x/2)$$
once more, using a fundamental property of the (physicists') Hermite polynomials $H_n$.

Again, this formula for $f(x)$ is at best formal, since one did not check whether the final series converges. But if, for instance, $f \in L^2(\R)$, then knowledge of all the derivatives of $F$ at $x = 0$ suffices to yield the coefficients $a_n$, and to thus reconstruct $f$ as a series of Hermite polynomials.

A third method of inverting the Weierstrass transform exploits its connection to the Laplace transform mentioned above, and the well-known inversion formula for the Laplace transform. The result is stated below for distributions.

== Generalizations ==
We can use convolution with the Gaussian kernel
$$\frac{1}{\sqrt{4\pi t}} e^{-\frac{x^2}{4t}}, \quad t > 0,$$
instead of
$$\frac{1}{\sqrt{4\pi}} e^{-\frac{x^2}{4}},$$
thus defining an operator W_{t}, the generalized Weierstrass transform.

For small values of $t$, $W_t[f]$ is very close to $f$, but smooth. The larger $t$, the more this operator averages out and changes $f$. Physically, $W_t$ corresponds to following the heat (or diffusion) equation for $t$ time units, and this is additive:
$$W_s \circ W_t = W_{s+t},$$
corresponding to "diffusing for $t$ time units, then $s$ time units, is equivalent to diffusing for $s + t$ time units". One can extend this to $t = 0$ by setting $W_0$ to be the identity operator (i.e. convolution with the Dirac delta function), and these then form a one-parameter semigroup of operators.

The kernel
$$\frac{1}{\sqrt{4\pi t}} e^{-\frac{x^2}{4t}}$$
used for the generalized Weierstrass transform is sometimes called the Gauss–Weierstrass kernel and is Green's function for the diffusion equation
$$(\partial_t -D^2) (e^{tD^2} f(x)) = 0,$$
on $\R$. $W_t$ can be computed from $W$: given a function $f(x)$, define a new function
$$f_t(x) := f(x\sqrt{t}),$$
then
$$W_t[f](x) = W[f_t](x\sqrt{t}),$$
a consequence of the substitution rule.

The Weierstrass transform can also be defined for certain classes of distributions or "generalized functions". For example, the Weierstrass transform of the Dirac delta is the Gaussian $\tfrac{1}{\sqrt{4\pi}} e^{-x^2/4}.$

In this context, rigorous inversion formulas can be proved, e.g.,
$$f(x) = \lim_{r\to\infty} \frac{1}{i\sqrt{4\pi}} \int_{x_0-ir}^{x_0+ir} F(z) e^{\frac{(x-z)^2}{4}} \,dz,$$
where $x_0$ is any fixed real number for which $F(x_0)$ exists, the integral extends over the vertical line in the complex plane with real part $x_0$, and the limit is to be taken in the sense of distributions.

Furthermore, the Weierstrass transform can be defined for real- or complex-valued functions (or distributions) defined on $\R^n$. We use the same convolution formula as above but interpret the integral as extending over all of $\R^n$ and the expression $(x - y)^2$ as the square of the Euclidean length of the vector $x - y$; the factor in front of the integral has to be adjusted so that the Gaussian will have a total integral of 1.

More generally, the Weierstrass transform can be defined on any Riemannian manifold: the heat equation can be formulated there (using the manifold's Laplace–Beltrami operator), and the Weierstrass transform $W[f]$ is then given by following the solution of the heat equation for one time unit, starting with the initial "temperature distribution" $f$.

== Related transforms ==
If one considers convolution with the kernel $\frac{1}{(1 + x^2)\pi}$ instead of with a Gaussian, one obtains the Poisson transform, which smoothes and averages a given function in a manner similar to the Weierstrass transform.

== See also ==
- Gaussian blur
- Gaussian filter
- Husimi Q representation
- Heat equation § Fundamental solutions
