= Streamline diffusion =

Diffusion going on along the advection direction

Streamline diffusion, given an advection-diffusion equation, refers to all diffusion going on along the advection direction.
