= Oriented energy filters =

Oriented energy filters are used to grant sight to intelligent machines and sensors. The light comes in and is filtered so that it can be properly computed and analyzed by the computer allowing it to “perceive” what it is measuring. These energy measurements are then calculated to take a real time measurement of the oriented space time structure.

3D Gaussian filters are used to extract orientation measurements. They were chosen due to their ability to capture a broad spectrum and easy and efficient computations.

The use of these vision systems can then be used in smart room, human interface and surveillance applications. The computations used can tell more than the standalone frame that most perceived motion devices such as a television frame. The objects captured by these devices would tell the velocity and energy of an object and its direction in relation to space and time. This also allows for better tracking ability and recognition.
