= Scale-space axioms =

Scale space
- Scale-space axioms
- Scale space implementation

Feature detection
- Edge detection
- Blob detection
- Corner detection
- Ridge detection
- Interest point detection

Scale selection

Affine shape adaptation

Scale-space segmentation

In image processing and computer vision, a scale space framework can be used to represent an image as a family of gradually smoothed images. This framework is very general and a variety of scale space representations exist. A typical approach for choosing a particular type of scale space representation is to establish a set of scale-space axioms, describing basic properties of the desired scale-space representation and often chosen so as to make the representation useful in practical applications. Once established, the axioms narrow the possible scale-space representations to a smaller class, typically with only a few free parameters.

A set of standard scale space axioms, discussed below, leads to the linear Gaussian scale-space, which is the most common type of scale space used in image processing and computer vision.

== Scale space axioms for the linear scale-space representation ==
The linear scale space representation $L(x, y, t) = (T_t f)(x, y) = g(x, y, t)*f(x, y)$ of signal $f(x, y)$ obtained by smoothing with the Gaussian kernel $g(x, y, t)$ satisfies a number of properties 'scale-space axioms' that make it a special form of multi-scale representation:

linearity
$$T_t(a f + b h) = a T_t f + b T_t h$$
where $f$ and $h$ are signals while $a$ and $b$ are constants,
shift invariance
$$T_t S_{(\Delta x, \Delta_y)} f = S_{(\Delta x, \Delta_y)} T_t f$$
where $S_{(\Delta x, \Delta_y)}$ denotes the shift (translation) operator $(S_{(\Delta x, \Delta_y)} f)(x, y) = f(x-\Delta x, y - \Delta y)$
semi-group structure
$$g(x, y, t_1) * g(x, y, t_2) = g(x, y, t_1 + t_2)$$
with the associated cascade smoothing property
$$L(x, y, t_2) = g(x, y, t_2 - t_1) * L(x, y, t_1)$$
existence of an infinitesimal generator $A$
$$\partial_t L(x, y, t) =  (A L)(x, y, t)$$
non-creation of local extrema (zero-crossings) in one dimension,
non-enhancement of local extrema in any number of dimensions
$\partial_t L(x, y, t) \leq 0$ at spatial maxima and $\partial_t L(x, y, t) \geq 0$ at spatial minima,
rotational symmetry
$g(x, y, t) = h(x^2+y^2, t)$ for some function $h$,
scale invariance
$$\hat{g}(\omega_x, \omega_y, t) = \hat{h}(\frac{\omega_x}{\varphi(t)}, \frac{\omega_x}{\varphi(t)})$$
for some functions $\varphi$ and $\hat{h}$ where $\hat{g}$ denotes the Fourier transform of $g$,
positivity
$$g(x, y, t) \geq 0$$,
normalization
$$\int_{x=-\infty}^{\infty} \int_{y=-\infty}^{\infty} g(x, y, t) \, dx \, dy = 1$$.

In fact, it can be shown that the Gaussian kernel is a unique choice given several different combinations of subsets of these scale-space axioms: most of the axioms (linearity, shift-invariance, semigroup) correspond to scaling being a semigroup of shift-invariant linear operator, which is satisfied by a number of families integral transforms, while "non-creation of local extrema" for one-dimensional signals or "non-enhancement of local extrema" for higher-dimensional signals are the crucial axioms which relate scale-spaces to smoothing (formally, parabolic partial differential equations), and hence select for the Gaussian.

The Gaussian kernel is also separable in Cartesian coordinates, i.e. $g(x, y, t) = g(x, t) \, g(y, t)$. Separability is, however, not counted as a scale-space axiom, since it is a coordinate dependent property related to issues of implementation. In addition, the requirement of separability in combination with rotational symmetry per se fixates the smoothing kernel to be a Gaussian.

There exists a generalization of the Gaussian scale-space theory to more general affine and spatio-temporal scale-spaces. In addition to variabilities over scale, which original scale-space theory was designed to handle, this generalized scale-space theory also comprises other types of variabilities, including image deformations caused by viewing variations, approximated by local affine transformations, and relative motions between objects in the world and the observer, approximated by local Galilean transformations. In this theory, rotational symmetry is not imposed as a necessary scale-space axiom and is instead replaced by requirements of affine and/or Galilean covariance. The generalized scale-space theory leads to predictions about receptive field profiles in good qualitative agreement with receptive field profiles measured by cell recordings in biological vision.

In the computer vision, image processing and signal processing literature there are many other multi-scale approaches, using wavelets and a variety of other kernels, that do not exploit or require the same requirements as scale space descriptions do; please see the article on related multi-scale approaches. There has also been work on discrete scale-space concepts that carry the scale-space properties over to the discrete domain; see the article on scale space implementation for examples and references.

== See also ==
- Scale space implementation
