= N-jet =

An N-jet is the set of (partial) derivatives of a function $f(x)$ up to order N.

Specifically, in the area of computer vision, the N-jet is usually computed from a scale space representation $L$ of the input image $f(x, y)$, and the partial derivatives of $L$ are used as a basis for expressing various types of visual modules. For example, algorithms for tasks such as feature detection, feature classification, stereo matching, tracking and object recognition can be expressed in terms of N-jets computed at one or several scales in scale space.

== See also ==
- Scale space implementation
- Jet (mathematics)
