= Diffusion equation =

Equation that describes density changes of a material that is diffusing in a medium

The diffusion equation is a parabolic partial differential equation. In physics, it describes the macroscopic behavior of many micro-particles in Brownian motion, resulting from the random movements and collisions of the particles (see Fick's laws of diffusion). In mathematics, it is related to Markov processes, such as random walks, and applied in many other fields, such as materials science, information theory, and biophysics. The diffusion equation is a special case of the convection–diffusion equation when bulk velocity is zero. It is equivalent to the heat equation under some circumstances.

== Statement ==
The equation is usually written as:
$$\frac{\partial\phi(\mathbf{r},t)}{\partial t} = \nabla \cdot \big[ D(\phi,\mathbf{r}) \ \nabla\phi(\mathbf{r},t) \big],$$
where ϕ(r, t) is the density of the diffusing material at location r and time t and D(ϕ, r) is the collective diffusion coefficient for density ϕ at location r; and ∇ represents the vector differential operator del. If the diffusion coefficient depends on the density then the equation is nonlinear, otherwise it is linear.

The equation above applies when the diffusion coefficient is isotropic; in the case of anisotropic diffusion, D is a symmetric positive definite matrix, and the equation is written (for three dimensional diffusion) as:
$$\frac{\partial\phi(\mathbf{r},t)}{\partial t} = \sum_{i=1}^3\sum_{j=1}^3 \frac{\partial}{\partial x_i}\left[D_{ij}(\phi,\mathbf{r})\frac{\partial \phi(\mathbf{r},t)}{\partial x_j}\right]$$
The diffusion equation has numerous analytic solutions.

If D is constant, then the equation reduces to the following linear parabolic partial differential equation:

$$\frac{\partial\phi(\mathbf{r},t)}{\partial t} = D\nabla^2\phi(\mathbf{r},t),$$

which is identical to the heat equation.

== Historical origin ==
The particle diffusion equation was originally derived by Adolf Fick in 1855.

== Derivation ==
The diffusion equation can be trivially derived from the continuity equation, which states that a change in density in any part of the system is due to inflow and outflow of material into and out of that part of the system. Effectively, no material is created or destroyed:
$$\frac{\partial\phi}{\partial t}+\nabla\cdot\mathbf{j}=0,$$
where j is the flux of the diffusing material. The diffusion equation can be obtained easily from this when combined with the phenomenological Fick's first law, which states that the flux of the diffusing material in any part of the system is proportional to the local density gradient:
$$\mathbf{j}=-D(\phi,\mathbf{r})\,\nabla\phi(\mathbf{r},t).$$

If drift must be taken into account, the Fokker–Planck equation provides an appropriate generalization.

== Discretization ==
The diffusion equation is continuous in both space and time. One may discretize space, time, or both space and time, which arise in application. Discretizing time alone just corresponds to taking time slices of the continuous system, and no new phenomena arise. In discretizing space alone, the Green's function becomes the discrete Gaussian kernel, rather than the continuous Gaussian kernel. In discretizing both time and space, one obtains the random walk.

== Discretization in image processing ==
The product rule is used to rewrite the anisotropic tensor diffusion equation, in standard discretization schemes, because direct discretization of the diffusion equation with only first order spatial central differences leads to checkerboard artifacts. The rewritten diffusion equation used in image filtering:
$$\frac{\partial\phi(\mathbf{r},t)}{\partial t} = \nabla\cdot \left[D(\phi,\mathbf{r})\right] \nabla \phi(\mathbf{r},t) + {\rm tr} \Big[ D(\phi,\mathbf{r})\big(\nabla\nabla^\text{T} \phi(\mathbf{r},t)\big)\Big]$$
where "tr" denotes the trace of the 2nd rank tensor, and superscript "T" denotes transpose, in which in image filtering D(ϕ, r) are symmetric matrices constructed from the eigenvectors of the image structure tensors. The spatial derivatives can then be approximated by two first order and a second order central finite differences. The resulting diffusion algorithm can be written as an image convolution with a varying kernel (stencil) of size 3 × 3 in 2D and 3 × 3 × 3 in 3D.

== See also ==
- Continuity equation
- Heat equation
- Self-similar solutions
- Reaction-diffusion equation
- Fokker–Planck equation
- Fick's laws of diffusion
- Maxwell–Stefan equation
- Radiative transfer equation and diffusion theory for photon transport in biological tissue
- Streamline diffusion
- Numerical solution of the convection–diffusion equation
