= L-moment =

Statistical sequence characterizing probability distributions

In statistics, L-moments are a sequence of statistics used to summarize the shape of a probability distribution. They are linear combinations of order statistics (L-statistics) analogous to conventional moments, and can be used to calculate quantities analogous to standard deviation, skewness and kurtosis, termed the L-scale, L-skewness and L-kurtosis respectively (the L-mean is identical to the conventional mean). Standardized L-moments are called L-moment ratios and are analogous to standardized moments. Just as for conventional moments, a theoretical distribution has a set of population L-moments. Sample L-moments can be defined for a sample from the population, and can be used as estimators of the population L-moments.

== Population L-moments ==
For a random variable X, the rth population L-moment is

$$\lambda_r = \frac{1}{r} \sum_{k=0}^{r-1} (-1)^k \binom{r-1}{k} \operatorname{\mathbb{E}} [ X_{r-k:r}] \, ,$$

where X_{k:n} denotes the kth order statistic (kth smallest value) in an independent sample of size n from the distribution of X and $\mathbb{E}$ denotes expected value operator. In particular, the first four population L-moments are

$$\begin{align}
\lambda_1 &= \operatorname{\mathbb E}[X] \\[4pt]
\lambda_2 &= \tfrac{1}{2} \left( \operatorname{\mathbb E}[ X_{2:2} ] -   \operatorname{\mathbb E}[ X_{1:2} ] \right) \\[4pt]
\lambda_3 &= \tfrac{1}{3} \left( \operatorname{\mathbb E}[ X_{3:3} ] - 2 \operatorname{\mathbb E}[ X_{2:3} ] +   \operatorname{\mathbb E}[ X_{1:3} ] \right) \\[4pt]
\lambda_4 &= \tfrac{1}{4} \left( \operatorname{\mathbb E}[ X_{4:4} ] - 3 \operatorname{\mathbb E}[ X_{3:4} ] + 3 \operatorname{\mathbb E}[ X_{2:4} ] - \operatorname{\mathbb E}[ X_{1:4} ] \right) .
\end{align}$$

Note that the coefficients of the rth L-moment are the same as in the rth term of the binomial transform, as used in the r-order finite difference (finite analog to the derivative).

The first two of these L-moments have conventional names:

- $\lambda_1$ is the "mean", "L-mean", or "L-location",
- $\lambda_2$ is the "L-scale".

The L-scale is equal to half the Mean absolute difference.

=== Analytic calculation ===
Expectations are often defined in terms of probability density functions, but the connection in terms of these between the order statistics $X_{r:n}$ and their underlying random variable $X$ is rather remote. A closer connection can be found in terms of cumulative distribution functions (CDFs), since these (see this section) satisfy
$$F_{X_{r:n}}(x) = \sum_{j=r}^n \binom{n}{j} F_X(x)^j \bigl( 1 - F_X(x) \bigr)^{n-j} .$$
In particular one may define polynomials $b_{r:n}(y) = \sum_{j=r}^n \binom{n}{j} y^j (1-y)^{n-j}$ and express $F_{X_{r:n}} = b_{r:n} \circ F_X$.

Having a CDF $F_X$, the expectation $\mathbb{E}\{X\}$ may be expressed using a Stieltjes integral as
$$\mathbb{E}\{X\} = \int_{\mathbb{R}} x \, dF_X(x) ,$$
thus
$$\mathbb{E}\{X_{r:n}\} =
\int_{\mathbb{R}} x \, d(b_{r:n} \circ F_X)(x) =
\int_{\mathbb{R}} x b_{r:n}'\bigl( F_X(x) \bigr) \, dF_X(x)$$
where $b_{r:n}'$ is straight off the derivative of $b_{r:n}$. This integral can often be made more tractable by introducing the quantile function $Q_X$ via the change of variables $y = F_X(x), x = Q_X(y)$:
$$\mathbb{E}\{X_{r:n}\} =
\int_{\mathbb{R}} x b_{r:n}'\bigl( F_X(x) \bigr) \, dF_X(x) =
\int_0^1 Q_X(y) b_{r:n}'(y) \, dy.$$
Since the L-moments are linear combinations of such expectations, the corresponding integrals can be combined into one for each moment, where the integrand is $Q_X(y)$ times a polynomial. We have
$$\lambda_n = \int_0^1 Q_X(y) \widetilde{P}_{n-1}(y) \, dy$$
where
$$\widetilde{P}_m(y) = \sum_{k=0}^m (-1)^{m-k} \binom{m}{k} \binom{m+k}{k} y^k$$
are the shifted Legendre polynomials, orthogonal on [0,1].

In particular
$$\begin{align}
\lambda_1 &= \int_0^1 Q_X(y) \, dy, \\[2pt]
\lambda_2 &= \int_0^1 Q_X(y) \left(2 y - 1\right) dy, \\[2pt]
\lambda_3 &= \int_0^1 Q_X(y) \left(6 y^2 - 6 y + 1\right) dy, \\[2pt]
\lambda_4 &= \int_0^1 Q_X(y) \left(20 y^3 - 30 y^2 + 12 y - 1\right) dy.
\end{align}$$

=== Sillitto's Theorem ===
The above integral formula for $\lambda_n$ has the form of a generalized Fourier coefficient, and they appeared as such in the literature years before being named moments. In the notation of this article, Sillitto proved

Theorem—Let $X$ be a real-valued continuous random variable with finite variance, quantile function $Q_X(y)$ and L-moments $\{ \lambda_r \}_{r=1}^\infty$. Then the representation
$$Q_X(y) = \sum_{r=1}^\infty (2r-1) \lambda_r \widetilde{P}_{r-1}(y) \qquad \text{for } 0 < y < 1$$
is convergent in $L^2$ norm.

However Hosking cautions that partial sums of this series tend to give poor approximations for the tails of the distribution, and need not be monotonic. Similar problems arise with the Cornish–Fisher expansion of $Q_X$ in terms of the cumulants of $X$.

== Sample L-moments ==
The sample L-moments can be computed as the population L-moments of the sample, summing over r-element subsets of the sample $\left\{ x_1 < \cdots < x_j < \cdots < x_r \right\},$ hence averaging by dividing by the binomial coefficient:
$$\lambda_r = \frac{1}{ r\cdot\tbinom{n}{r} }\, \sum_{x_1 < \cdots < x_j < \cdots < x_r} (-1)^{r-j} \binom{r-1}{j}\, x_j \,.$$

Grouping these by order statistic counts the number of ways an element of an n element sample can be the jth element of an r element subset, and yields formulas of the form below. Direct estimators for the first four L-moments in a finite sample of n observations are:

$$\begin{align}
\ell_1 &= \frac{1}{  \tbinom{n}{1} } \sum_{i=1}^n x_{(i)} \\[1ex]
\ell_2 &= \frac{1}{ 2\tbinom{n}{2} } \sum_{i=1}^n \left[ \tbinom{i-1}{1} - \tbinom{n-i}{1} \right] x_{(i)} \\[1ex]
\ell_3 &= \frac{1}{ 3\tbinom{n}{3} } \sum_{i=1}^n \left[ \tbinom{i-1}{2} - 2\tbinom{i-1}{1}\tbinom{n-i}{1} + \tbinom{n-i}{2} \right] x_{(i)} \\[1ex]
\ell_4 &= \frac{1}{ 4\tbinom{n}{4} } \sum_{i=1}^n \left[ \tbinom{i-1}{3} - 3\tbinom{i-1}{2}\tbinom{n-i}{1} + 3\tbinom{i-1}{1}\tbinom{n-i}{2} - \tbinom{n-i}{3} \right] x_{(i)}
\end{align}$$

where x_{(i)} is the ith order statistic and $\tbinom{\boldsymbol\cdot}{\boldsymbol\cdot}$ is a binomial coefficient. Sample L-moments can also be defined indirectly in terms of probability weighted moments, which leads to a more efficient algorithm for their computation.

== L-moment ratios ==
A set of L-moment ratios, or scaled L-moments, is defined by
$$\tau_r = \lambda_r / \lambda_2, \qquad r = 3, 4, \dots ~.$$
The most useful of these are $\tau_3 ,$ called the L-skewness, and $\tau_4 ,$ the L-kurtosis.

L-moment ratios lie within the interval (−1, 1). Tighter bounds can be found for some specific L-moment ratios; in particular, the L-kurtosis $\tau_4$ lies in [−1 /4, 1), and
$$\tfrac{1}{4} \left( 5 \tau_3^2 - 1 \right) \leq \tau_4 < 1 \, .$$

A quantity analogous to the coefficient of variation, but based on L-moments, can also be defined:
$$\tau = \lambda_2 / \lambda_1 \, ,$$
which is called the "coefficient of L-variation", or "L-CV". For a non-negative random variable, this lies in the interval (0, 1) and is identical to the Gini coefficient.

== Related quantities ==
L-moments are statistical quantities that are derived from probability weighted moments (PWM) which were defined earlier (1979). PWM are used to efficiently estimate the parameters of distributions expressable in inverse form such as the Gumbel, the Tukey lambda, and the Wakeby distributions.

== Usage ==
There are two common ways that L-moments are used, in both cases analogously to the conventional moments:

1. As summary statistics for data.
2. To derive estimators for the parameters of probability distributions, applying the method of moments to the L-moments rather than conventional moments.

In addition to doing these with standard moments, the latter (estimation) is more commonly done using maximum likelihood methods; however using L-moments provides a number of advantages. Specifically, L-moments are more robust than conventional moments, and existence of higher L-moments only requires that the random variable have finite mean. One disadvantage of L-moment ratios for estimation is their typically smaller sensitivity. For instance, the Laplace distribution has a kurtosis of 6 and weak exponential tails, but a larger 4th L-moment ratio than e.g. the student-t distribution with d.f.=3, which has an infinite kurtosis and much heavier tails.

As an example consider a dataset with a few data points and one outlying data value. If the ordinary standard deviation of this data set is taken it will be highly influenced by this one point: however, if the L-scale is taken it will be far less sensitive to this data value. Consequently, L-moments are far more meaningful when dealing with outliers in data than conventional moments. However, there are also other better suited methods to achieve an even higher robustness than just replacing moments by L-moments. One example of this is using L-moments as summary statistics in extreme value theory (EVT). This application shows the limited robustness of L-moments, i.e. L-statistics are not resistant statistics, as a single extreme value can throw them off, but because they are only linear (not higher-order statistics), they are less affected by extreme values than conventional moments.

Another advantage L-moments have over conventional moments is that their existence only requires the random variable to have finite mean, so the L-moments exist even if the higher conventional moments do not exist (for example, for Student's t distribution with low degrees of freedom). A finite variance is required in addition in order for the standard errors of estimates of the L-moments to be finite.

Some appearances of L-moments in the statistical literature include the book by David & Nagaraja (2003, Section 9.9) and a number of papers. A number of favourable comparisons of L-moments with ordinary moments have been reported.

== Values for some common distributions ==
The table below gives expressions for the first two L moments and numerical values of the first two L-moment ratios of some common continuous probability distributions with constant L-moment ratios. More complex expressions have been derived for some further distributions for which the L-moment ratios vary with one or more of the distributional parameters, including the log-normal, Gamma, generalized Pareto, generalized extreme value, and generalized logistic distributions.

Distribution	Parameters	mean, λ_{1}	L-scale, λ_{2}	L-skewness, τ_{3}	L-kurtosis, τ_{4}
Uniform	a, b	1 /2(a + b)	1 /6(b – a)	0	0
Logistic	μ, s	μ	s	0	1 /6 = 0.1667
Normal	μ, σ^{2}	μ	σ/ √π	0	30 θ_{m}/π − 9 = 0.1226
Laplace	μ, b	μ	3 / 4 b	0	1/( 3 √2 ) = 0.2357
Student's t, 2 d.f.	ν = 2	0	π/( 2 √2 ) = 1.111	0	3 / 8 = 0.375
Student's t, 4 d.f.	ν = 4	0	15 /64 π = 0.7363	0	111 /512 = 0.2168
Exponential	λ	1/ λ	1/( 2 λ )	1 /3 = 0.3333	1 /6 = 0.1667
Gumbel	μ, β	μ + γ_{e} β	β log_{2}(3)	2 log_{2}(3) − 3 = 0.1699	16 − 10 log_{2}(3) = 0.1504

The notation for the parameters of each distribution is the same as that used in the linked article. In the expression for the mean of the Gumbel distribution, γ_{e} is the Euler–Mascheroni constant 0.5772 1566 4901 ... .

== Extensions ==
Trimmed L-moments are generalizations of L-moments that give zero weight to extreme observations. They are therefore more robust to the presence of outliers, and unlike L-moments they may be well-defined for distributions for which the mean does not exist, such as the Cauchy distribution.

== See also ==
- L-estimator
