= Joseph Lawson Hodges Jr. =

American statistician (1922-2000)

- Born: April 10, 1922; Shreveport, Louisiana, United States
- Died: March 1, 2000 (aged 77); California, United States
- Education: University of California, Berkeley
- Known for: Hodges bivariate sign test Hodges–Lehmann estimator Hodges’ estimator k-nearest neighbors algorithm
- Awards: Institute of Mathematical Statistics, 1950; Guggenheim fellow, 1956-57; President, WNAR Region, Biometric Society, 1958-60
- Scientific career
- Fields: Statistics
- Workplaces: University of California, Berkeley
- Doctoral advisor: Jerzy Neyman

Joseph Lawson Hodges Jr. (April 10, 1922 – March 1, 2000) was an American statistician. He obtained a Ph.D. in 1949 at the University of California, Berkeley, and joined the statistics faculty there.

Born in 1922 in Shreveport, Louisiana, Hodges grew up in Phoenix, Arizona. He received his B.A. from the University of California in 1942. In the summer of 1944 he joined an Operations analysis group and after some training served in that capacity (together with his fellow budding statisticians Erich Leo Lehmann and George Nicholson) with the Twentieth Air Force on Harmon Air Force Base, Guam. After the war he continued this work for another year in Washington, D.C. There he met Theodora Jane Long, and they married in 1947. He then joined the new statistics program at Berkeley and remained there for the rest of his career.

Hodges is best known for his contributions to the field of statistics, including the Hodges–Lehmann estimator, the nearest neighbor rule (with Evelyn Fix) and Hodges’ estimator.

== Bibliography ==
- Hodges, Joseph L.; Lehmann, E. L. (1964). Basic concepts of probability and statistics. Holden-Day.
