= Pseudomedian =

Statistical measure of centrality

In statistics, the pseudomedian is a measure of centrality for data-sets and populations. It agrees with the median for symmetric data-sets or populations. In mathematical statistics, the pseudomedian is also a location parameter for probability distributions.

== Description ==
The pseudomedian of a distribution $F$ is defined to be a median of the distribution of $(Z_1+Z_2)/2$, where $Z_1$ and $Z_2$ are independent, each with the same distribution $F$.

When $F$ is a symmetric distribution, the pseudomedian coincides with the median; otherwise this is not generally the case. For example, the median of an exponential distribution of rate 1 is about 0.693, while its pseudomedian is about 0.839.

The Hodges–Lehmann statistic, defined as the median of all of the midpoints of pairs of observations, is a consistent estimator of the pseudomedian.

Like the set of medians, the pseudomedian is well defined for all probability distributions, even for the many distributions that lack modes or means.

== Pseudomedian filter in signal processing ==
In signal processing there is another definition of pseudomedian filter for discrete signals.

For a time series of length 2N + 1, the pseudomedian is defined as follows. Construct N + 1 sliding windows each of length N + 1. For each window, compute the minimum and maximum. Across all N + 1 windows, find the maximum minimum and the minimum maximum. The pseudomedian is the average of these two quantities.

== See also ==
- Hodges–Lehmann estimator
- Median filter
- Lulu smoothing
