= Regular estimator =

Class of statistical estimators

Regular estimators are a class of statistical estimators that satisfy certain regularity conditions which make them amenable to asymptotic analysis. The convergence of a regular estimator's distribution is, in a sense, locally uniform. This is often considered desirable and leads to the convenient property that a small change in the parameter does not dramatically change the distribution of the estimator.

== Definition ==
An estimator $\hat{\theta}_n$ of $\psi(\theta)$ based on a sample of size $n$ is said to be regular if for every $h$:

$$\sqrt n \left ( \hat{\theta}_n - \psi (\theta + h/\sqrt n) \right ) \stackrel{\theta+h/\sqrt n} {\rightarrow} L_\theta$$

where the convergence is in distribution under the law of $\theta + h/\sqrt n$. $L_\theta$ is some asymptotic distribution (usually this is a normal distribution with mean zero and variance which may depend on $\theta$).

== Examples of non-regular estimators ==
Both the Hodges' estimator and the James-Stein estimator are non-regular estimators when the population parameter $\theta$ is exactly 0.

== See also ==
- Estimator
- Cramér–Rao bound
- Hodges' estimator
- James-Stein estimator
