= Hodges' estimator =

Type of statistical estimator

In statistics, Hodges' estimator (or the Hodges–Le Cam estimator), named for Joseph Hodges, is a famous counterexample demonstrating the existence of an estimator which is "superefficient", i.e. it attains smaller asymptotic variance than regular efficient estimators. The existence of such a counterexample is the reason for the introduction of the notion of regular estimators.

Hodges' estimator improves upon a regular estimator at a single point. In general, any superefficient estimator may surpass a regular estimator at most on a set of Lebesgue measure zero.

Although Hodges discovered the estimator he never published it; the first publication was in the doctoral thesis of Lucien Le Cam.

== Construction ==
Suppose $\hat{\theta}_n$ is a "common" estimator for some parameter $\theta$: it is consistent, and converges to some asymptotic distribution $L_\theta$ (usually this is a normal distribution with mean zero and variance which may depend on $\theta$) at the $\sqrt{n}$-rate:

$$\sqrt{n}(\hat\theta_n - \theta)\ \xrightarrow{d}\ L_\theta\ .$$

Then the Hodges' estimator $\hat{\theta}_n^H$ is defined as

$$\hat\theta_n^H = \begin{cases}\hat\theta_n, & \text{if } |\hat\theta_n| \geq n^{-1/4}, \text{ and} \\ 0, & \text{if } |\hat\theta_n| < n^{-1/4}.\end{cases}$$

This estimator is equal to $\hat{\theta}_n$ everywhere except on the small interval $[-n^{-1/4},n^{-1/4}]$, where it is equal to zero. It is not difficult to see that this estimator is consistent for $\theta$, and its asymptotic distribution is

$$\begin{align}
& n^\alpha(\hat\theta_n^H - \theta) \ \xrightarrow{d}\ 0, \qquad\text{when } \theta = 0, \\
&\sqrt{n}(\hat\theta_n^H - \theta)\ \xrightarrow{d}\ L_\theta, \quad \text{when } \theta\neq 0,
\end{align}$$

for any $\alpha\in\mathbb{R}$. Thus this estimator has the same asymptotic distribution as $\hat{\theta}_n$ for all $\theta\neq 0$, whereas for $\theta=0$ the rate of convergence becomes arbitrarily fast. This estimator is superefficient, as it surpasses the asymptotic behavior of the efficient estimator $\hat{\theta}_n$ at least at one point $\theta=0$.

It is not true that the Hodges estimator is equivalent to the sample mean, but much better when the true mean is 0. The correct interpretation is that, for finite $n$, the truncation can lead to worse square error than the sample mean estimator for $E[X]$ close to 0, as is shown in the example in the following section.

Le Cam shows that this behaviour is typical: superefficiency at the point θ implies the existence of a sequence $\theta_n \rightarrow \theta$ such that $\liminf_{n\to\infty} E \theta_n \ell (\sqrt n (\hat \theta_n - \theta_n ))$ is strictly larger than the Cramér–Rao bound. For the extreme case where the asymptotic risk at θ is zero, the $\liminf_{n\to\infty}$ is even infinite for a sequence $\theta_n \rightarrow \theta$.

In general, superefficiency may only be attained on a subset of Lebesgue measure zero of the parameter space $\Theta$.

== Example ==
The mean square error (times n) of Hodges' estimator. Blue curve corresponds to n = 5, purple to n = 50, and olive to n = 500.

Suppose x_{1}, ..., x_{n} is an independent and identically distributed (IID) random sample from normal distribution N(θ, 1) with unknown mean but known variance. Then the common estimator for the population mean θ is the arithmetic mean of all observations: $\bar{x}$. The corresponding Hodges' estimator will be $\hat\theta^H_n \;=\; \bar{x}\cdot\mathbf{1}\{|\bar x|\,\geq\,n^{-1/4}\}$, where 1{...} denotes the indicator function.

The mean square error (scaled by n) associated with the regular estimator x̅ is constant and equal to 1 for all θ's. At the same time the mean square error of the Hodges' estimator $\hat\theta_n^H$ behaves erratically in the vicinity of zero, and even becomes unbounded as n → ∞. This demonstrates that the Hodges' estimator is not regular, and its asymptotic properties are not adequately described by limits of the form (θ fixed, n → ∞).

== See also ==
- James–Stein estimator

== Notes ==
=== References ===
- Bickel, Peter J.; Klaassen, Chris A.J.; Ritov, Ya’acov; Wellner, Jon A. (1998). Efficient and adaptive estimation for semiparametric models. Springer: New York. ISBN 0-387-98473-9.
- Kale, B.K. (1985). "A note on the super efficient estimator". Journal of Statistical Planning and Inference. 12: 259–263. doi:10.1016/0378-3758(85)90074-6.
- Stoica, P.; Ottersten, B. (1996). "The evil of superefficiency". Signal Processing. 55: 133–136. doi:10.1016/S0165-1684(96)00159-4.
- Vaart, A. W. van der (1998). Asymptotic statistics. Cambridge University Press. ISBN 978-0-521-78450-4.
