= Cornish–Fisher expansion =

Infinite series used to approximate quantiles of probability distributions

In probability theory, the Cornish–Fisher expansion is an asymptotic expansion used to approximate the quantiles of a probability distribution based on its cumulants.

It is named after E. A. Cornish and R. A. Fisher, who first described the technique in 1937.

The analogous expansion using L-moments is due to Sillitto.

== Definition ==
For a random variable X with mean μ, variance σ², and cumulants κ_{n}, its quantile y_{p} at order-of-quantile p can be estimated as $y_p \approx \mu + \sigma w_p$ where:

$$\begin{align}
w_p &=& x &+ \left[\gamma_1 h_1(x)\right]\\
&&&+ \left[\gamma_2 h_2(x) + \gamma_1^2 h_{11}(x)\right]\\
&&&+ \left[\gamma_3 h_3(x) + \gamma_1\gamma_2 h_{12}(x) + \gamma_1^3 h_{111}(x)\right]\\
&&&+ \cdots\\
\end{align}$$

$$\begin{align}
x &= \Phi^{-1}(p)\\
\gamma_{r - 2} &= \frac{\kappa_r}{\kappa_2^{r/2}};\; r \in \{3, 4, \ldots\}\\
h_1(x) &= \frac{\mathrm{He}_2(x)}{6}\\
h_2(x) &= \frac{\mathrm{He}_3(x)}{24}\\
h_{11}(x) &= -\frac{\left[2\mathrm{He}_3(x) + \mathrm{He}_1(x)\right]}{36}\\
h_3(x) &= \frac{\mathrm{He}_4(x)}{120}\\
h_{12}(x) &= -\frac{\left[\mathrm{He}_4(x) + \mathrm{He}_2(x)\right]}{24}\\
h_{111}(x) &= \frac{\left[12\mathrm{He}_4(x) + 19\mathrm{He}_2(x)\right]}{324}
\end{align}$$

where He_{n} is the n^{th} probabilists' Hermite polynomial. The values γ_{1} and γ_{2} are the random variable's skewness and (excess) kurtosis respectively. The value(s) in each set of brackets are the terms for that level of polynomial estimation, and all must be calculated and combined for the Cornish–Fisher expansion at that level to be valid.

== Example ==
Let X be a random variable with mean 10, variance 25, skew 5, and excess kurtosis of 2. We can use the first two bracketed terms above, which depend only on skew and kurtosis, to estimate quantiles of this random variable. For the 95th percentile, the value for which the standard normal cumulative distribution function is 0.95 is 1.644854, which will be x. The w weight can be calculated as:

$$\begin{align}
1.644854 &+ 5\cdot\frac{1.644854^2 - 1}{6}\\
&+ 2\cdot\frac{1.644854^3 - 3\cdot 1.644854}{24} - 5^2\frac{2\cdot 1.644854^3 - 5\cdot 1.644854}{36}
\end{align}$$

or about 2.55621. So the estimated 95th percentile of X is 10 + 5×2.55621 or about 22.781. For comparison, the 95th percentile of a normal random variable with mean 10 and variance 25 would be about 18.224; it makes sense that the normal random variable has a lower 95th percentile value, as the normal distribution has no skew or excess kurtosis, and so has a thinner tail than the random variable X.
