= Juliet Popper Shaffer =

American psychologist, statistician & academic

- Born: Juliet Martha Popper; May 23, 1932 (age 93); Brooklyn, New York, U.S.
- Education: Swarthmore College; Stanford University
- Spouse(s): John Walker Gray (1953-1955); Harry George Shaffer (1960-1975); Erich Leo Lehmann (1977-2009)
- Scientific career
- Institutions: University of Kansas; University of California, Berkeley; Educational Testing Service
- Doctoral advisor: Robert Richardson Sears
- Other academic advisors: William Kaye Estes; Erich Leo Lehmann

Juliet Popper Shaffer (born May 23, 1932) is an American psychologist, statistician and statistics educator known for her research on multiple hypothesis testing. She is a teaching professor emerita at the University of California, Berkeley.

== Education and career ==
Juliet Martha Popper was born in Brooklyn, and took four years of mathematics at Midwood High School in Brooklyn, a curriculum that was at that time intended only for boys. She did her undergraduate studies at Swarthmore College, following the lead of classmate Arthur Mattuck, and despite the anti-women and anti-Jewish admission quotas then in place at Swarthmore. After several changes of topic she ended up majoring in psychology and minoring in mathematics and philosophy. She graduated in 1953, married a classmate, and moved to Stanford University for graduate study in psychology. Her marriage broke up during her studies, but she completed her Ph.D. in psychology at in 1957. She published a modified version of her dissertation, Motivational and social factors in children's perceptions of height, as Social and personality correlates of children's estimates of height with Journal Press in 1964.

After postdoctoral studies with William Kaye Estes at Indiana University, she joined the faculty in psychology at the University of Kansas. At Kansas, Popper was involved with local struggles for desegregation, and became the first chair of the university's Affirmative Action Board. During this time she married her second husband, Harry G. Shaffer, another faculty member who already had children. She was informed at the time of their marriage that, because of Kansas's anti-nepotism rules, only one of her or her husband could win tenure, but this rule was changed when she finally went up for tenure, a year late because having children made her department think she wasn't serious about psychology. The part-time teaching schedule she followed while raising her children delayed her chances for taking a sabbatical, but finally, in 1973, she was allowed to take a sabbatical at Berkeley, under the supervision of Erich Leo Lehmann. In the same year she divorced her husband.

In 1977 she married Lehmann and moved to Berkeley. The psychology department there was not hiring, so she took a visiting position at the University of California, Davis and then a year later became a lecturer in statistics at Berkeley. At Berkeley, she also ran a "drop-in consulting service", and by 1981 achieved security of employment, the equivalent of tenure for lecturers. Her job title was later changed to Teaching Professor. She retired in 1994, and spent several of the following years as a researcher at the Educational Testing Service in Princeton, New Jersey.

== Research ==
Shaffer's work in psychology at Kansas involved learning theory, personality, and perception. She also developed experimental designs to test the theories of a colleague, Fritz and Grace Heider, involving the ways in which the personal connection between two people can influence the transmission of a feeling towards another object from one of the two people to the other. Later at Kansas, she became interested in the multiple comparisons problem in statistics, where using the same experiment to make multiple inferences can cause a greater likelihood of erroneous inferences, after observing this effect in student work; it would become the main research topic of her later career.

Lehmann writes that Shaffer "became one of the leaders" in the field of multiple comparisons, with her "two most importance contributions" occurring in connection with a psychological experiment in which she observed the non-transitivity of significant differences in multiple comparisons. Of three ordered conditions in the experiment, the smaller and the larger conditions had significantly different outcomes from each other, but neither was significantly different from the middle condition. This paradoxical outcome led Shaffer to classify the allowable patterns of significant differences and to find interpretations of those patterns, and led others to perform follow-up research making her methods more implementable in practice. Another of her results in this area was the observation that, in analyzing multiple comparisons, it is important to include in the analysis type III errors, in which one rejects the null hypothesis but concludes that an effect has the opposite sign to its actual sign.

== Recognition ==
In 1988, Shaffer was elected to be a Fellow of the American Statistical Association and of the American Psychological Association. She is also a fellow of the American Association for the Advancement of Science and an elected member of the International Statistical Institute. In 2003, the Committee of Presidents of Statistical Societies gave her their Florence Nightingale David Award "for her pioneering contributions to statistical methods in education and psychometrics; for her exceptional role in fostering opportunities for and in support of the advancement of women in the sciences".
