= Erich Leo Lehmann =

American statistician (1917–2009)

Erich Lehmann
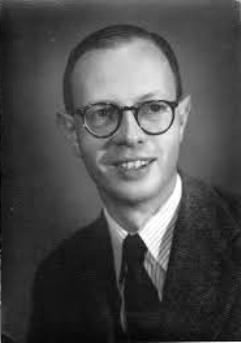
- Born: 20 November 1917; Strasbourg, Alsace–Lorraine, German Empire
- Died: 12 September 2009 (aged 91)
- Education: Doctor of Philosophy - University of California, Berkeley
- Known for: Testing Statistical Hypotheses; Completeness (statistics); Lehmann–Scheffé theorem Hodges–Lehmann estimator nonparametric tests
- Spouse: Juliet Popper Shaffer
- Awards: President of the Institute of Mathematical Statistics; Fellow of the American Statistical Association; American Academy of Arts and Sciences; National Academy of Sciences.
- Scientific career
- Fields: Statistics
- Workplaces: University of California, Berkeley
- Doctoral advisor: Jerzy Neyman
- Doctoral students: Peter J. Bickel; Allan Birnbaum; Madan Lal Puri; Frank Hampel

Erich Leo Lehmann (20 November 1917 – 12 September 2009) was a German-born American statistician, who made a major contribution to nonparametric hypothesis testing. He is one of the eponyms of the Lehmann–Scheffé theorem and of the Hodges–Lehmann estimator.

== Early life ==
Lehmann was born in Strasbourg, Alsace-Lorraine in 1917 to a family of Ashkenazi Jewish ancestry. He grew up in Frankfurt am Main, Germany, until the Machtergreifung in 1933, when his family fled to Switzerland to escape the Nazis. He graduated from high school in Zurich, and studied mathematics for two years at Trinity College, Cambridge. Following that, he emigrated to the United States, arriving in New York in late 1940. He enrolled in University of California, Berkeley as a post-graduate student—albeit without a prior degree—in 1941.

== Career ==
Lehmann obtained his MA in mathematics in 1942 and his PhD (under Jerzy Neyman) in 1946, at the University of California, Berkeley, where he taught from 1942. From August 1944 to August 1945 he worked as an operations analyst for the United States Air Force on Guam. He taught at Columbia University and at Princeton University during 1950–51, and then during 1951–1952 he was a visiting associate professor at Stanford University.

He was an editor of the Annals of Mathematical Statistics and president of the Institute of Mathematical Statistics, and a member of the American Academy of Arts and Sciences and the National Academy of Sciences.

In 1977 he married another statistician, Juliet Popper Shaffer, whom he had met four years earlier as the sponsor to her sabbatical visit to Berkeley. In the same year, Shaffer moved from being a psychology professor at the University of Kansas to a lecturer position in statistics at Berkeley.

In 1997, on the occasion of his eightieth birthday, the department of statistics at the University of California at Berkeley created the Erich Lehmann Fund in Statistics to support the students of the department.

== Selected publications ==
=== Books ===
- Testing Statistical Hypotheses, 1959
- Basic Concepts of Probability and Statistics, 1964, co-author J. L. Hodges
- Elements of Finite Probability, 1965, co-author J. L. Hodges
- Lehmann, Erich L.; With the special assistance of H. J. M. D'Abrera (2006). Nonparametrics: Statistical methods based on ranks (Reprinting of 1988 revision of 1975 Holden-Day ed.). New York: Springer. pp. xvi+463. ISBN 978-0-387-35212-1. MR 2279708.
- Theory of Point Estimation, 1983
- Lehmann, Erich L. (1998). Elements of Large-Sample Theory. New York: Springer Verlag. ISBN 978-0-387-98595-4.
- Reminiscences of a Statistician, 2007, ISBN 978-0-387-71596-4
- Fisher, Neyman, and the Creation of Classical Statistics, 2011, ISBN 978-1-4419-9499-8 [published posthumously]

=== Articles ===
- Lehmann, E.L.; Scheffé, H. (1950). "Completeness, similar regions, and unbiased estimation. I." Sankhyā: the Indian Journal of Statistics. 10 (4): 305–340. doi:10.1007/978-1-4614-1412-4_23. JSTOR 25048038. MR 0039201.
- Lehmann, E.L.; Scheffé, H. (1955). "Completeness, similar regions, and unbiased estimation. II". Sankhyā: The Indian Journal of Statistics. 15 (3): 219–236. doi:10.1007/978-1-4614-1412-4_24. JSTOR 25048243. MR 0072410.
- Hodges, J. L.; Lehmann, E. L. (1956). "The efficiency of some nonparametric competitors of the t-test". Annals of Mathematical Statistics. 27 (2): 324–335. Bibcode:1956AnnMS..27..324H. doi:10.1214/aoms/1177728261.
- Hodges, J. L.; Lehmann, E. L. (1963). "Estimation of location based on ranks". Annals of Mathematical Statistics. 34 (2): 598–611. doi:10.1214/aoms/1177704172.
