= Wakeby distribution =

Probability distribution

- Parameters: $\alpha, \beta, \gamma, \delta, \xi$
- Support: $\xi$ to $\infty$, if $\delta \ge 0, \gamma > 0$ $\xi$ to $\xi + (\alpha/ \beta) - (\gamma/ \delta)$, otherwise
- Quantile: $\xi + \frac{\alpha}{\beta}(1 - (1-p)^{\beta}) - \frac{\gamma}{\delta}(1 - (1-p)^{-\delta})$

The Wakeby distribution is a five-parameter probability distribution defined by its quantile function,

$$W(p) =\xi + \frac{\alpha}{\beta}(1 - (1-p)^{\beta}) - \frac{\gamma}{\delta}(1 - (1-p)^{-\delta})$$,

and by its quantile density function,

$$W'(p) = w(p) = \alpha (1-p)^{\beta - 1} + \gamma (1-p)^{-\delta - 1}$$,

where $0 \le p \le 1$, ξ is a location parameter, α and γ are scale parameters and β and δ are shape parameters.

This distribution was first proposed by John C. Houghton while under the supervision of Harold A. Thomas Jr., who named it after Wakeby Pond in Cape Cod.

== Applications ==
The Wakeby distribution has been used for modeling distributions of

- flood flows,
- citation counts,
- extreme rainfall,
- tidal current speeds,
- peak flows of rivers,
- and extreme wind speeds.

== Parameters and domain ==
The following restrictions apply to the parameters of this distribution:

- $\beta + \delta \ge 0$
- Either $\beta + \delta > 0$ or $\beta = \gamma = \delta = 0$
- If $\gamma > 0$, then $\delta > 0$
- $\gamma \ge 0$
- $\alpha + \gamma \ge 0$

The domain of the Wakeby distribution is

- $\xi$ to $\infty$, if $\delta \ge 0$ and $\gamma > 0$
- $\xi$ to $\xi + (\alpha/ \beta) - (\gamma/ \delta)$, if $\delta < 0$ or $\gamma = 0$

With two shape parameters, the Wakeby distribution can model a wide variety of shapes.

== CDF and PDF ==
The cumulative distribution function is computed by numerically inverting the quantile function given above. The probability density function is then found by using the following relation (given on page 46 of Johnson, Kotz, and Balakrishnan):

$$f(x) = \frac{(1 - F(x))^{(\delta+1)}}{\alpha t + \gamma}$$

where F is the cumulative distribution function and

$$t = (1 - F(x))^{(\beta + \delta)}$$

An implementation that computes the probability density function of the Wakeby distribution is included in the Dataplot scientific computation library, as routine WAKPDF.

An alternative to the above method is to define the PDF parametrically as $(W(p),1/w(p)), \ 0\le p \le 1$. This can be set up as a probability density function, $f(x)$, by solving for the unique $p$ in the equation $W(p)=x$ and returning $1/w(p)$.

== See also ==
- Generalized Pareto distribution
