= L-statistic =

In statistics, an L-statistic is a statistic (function of a data set) that is a linear combination of order statistics; the "L" is for "linear". These are more often referred to by narrower terms according to use, namely:

- L-estimator, using L-statistics as estimators for parameters
- L-moment, L-statistic analogs of the conventional moments
