= Peleng lens =

MC PELENG 3.5/8A Fisheye Lens
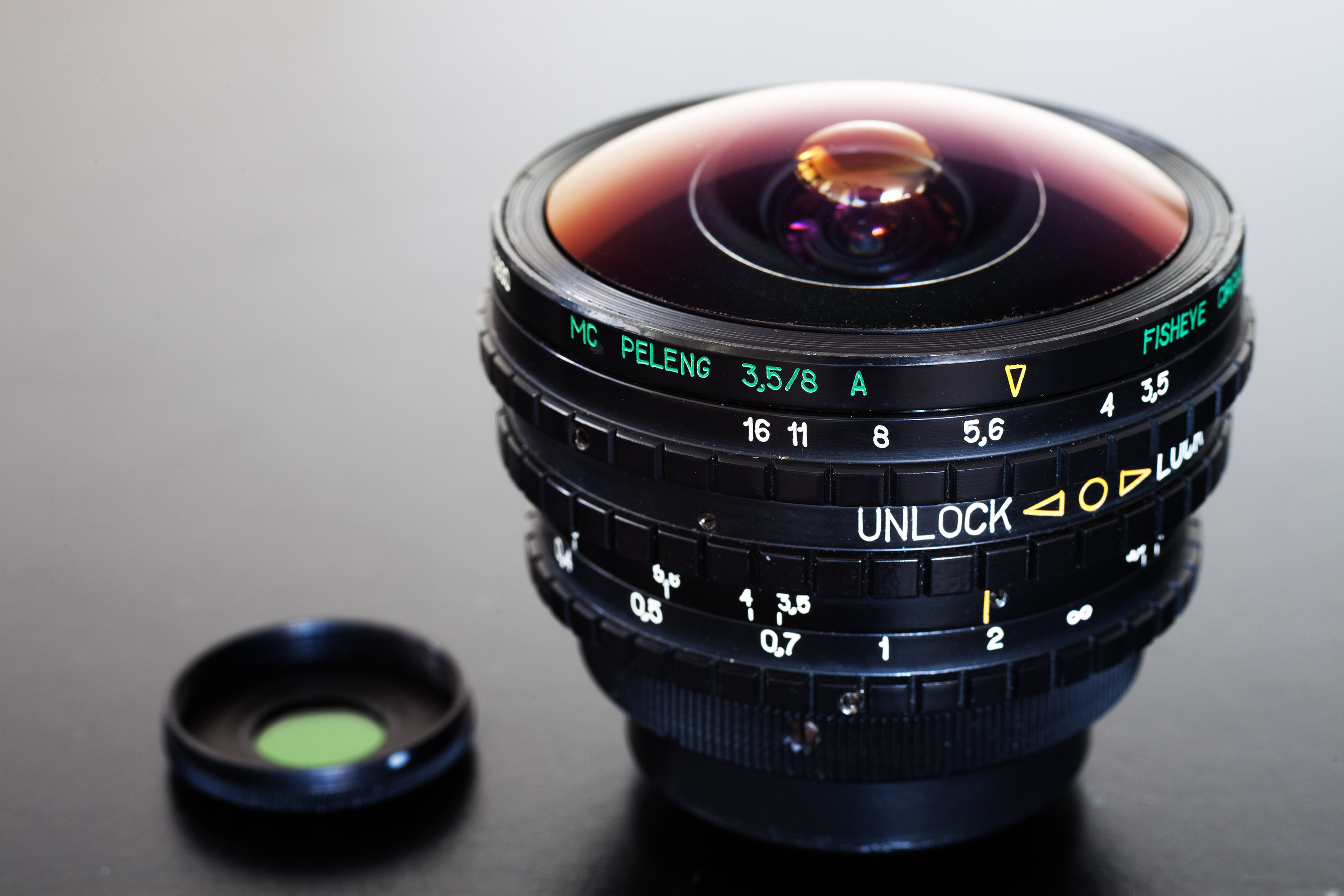
- Peleng 8mm fisheye, with supplied colour filter.
- Maker: BELOMO

Technical data
- Type: circular fisheye lens
- Focal length: 8 mm
- Crop factor: 180 degrees
- Aperture (max/min): f/3.5 - f/16
- Close focus distance: 0.22 m (0.72 ft)
- Construction: 11 elements in 7 groups

Features
- Short back focus: n/a
- Ultrasonic motor: none
- Lens-based stabilization: none
- Macro capable: n/a
- Unique features: Fisheye
- Application: n/a

Physical
- Max. length: 65.5 mm (2.58 in)
- Diameter: 73.5 mm (2.89 in)
- Weight: 400 g (14 oz)
- Filter diameter: rear (Gelatin filter)

Accessories
- Lens hood: n/a

Angle of view
- Horizontal: 180°
- Vertical: 180°
- Diagonal: 180°

Retail info
- MSRP: $299.99 USD

Peleng 3.5/8A is an 8 mm super-wideangle circular fisheye photographic lens, and is designed as an interchangeable lens for Canon, Nikon, Pentax, Olympus digital or film cameras which have or do not have the instant-return diaphragm automatic control device. The lens has a variable diaphragm from f/3.5 to f/16. The lens has antireflective coating. This lens casts a 24mm image circle on a 24x36mm frame. It occupies only part of frame 24x36 and fits in a small side of a frame with a small cutting along the edges. The geometric centers of the image and the frame coincide.

== Gallery ==
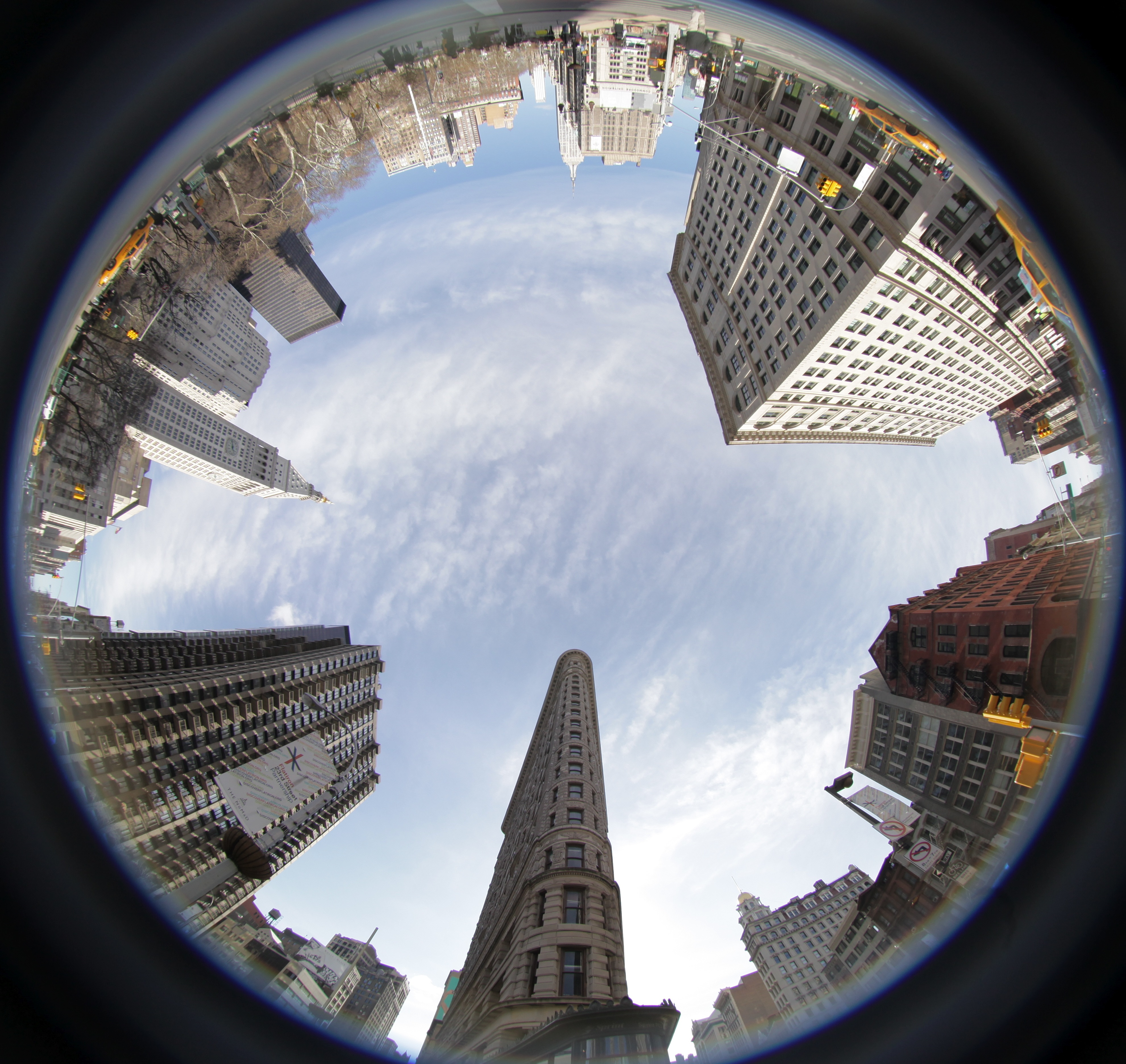
The Flatiron Building, shot with the lens pointed nearly straight up

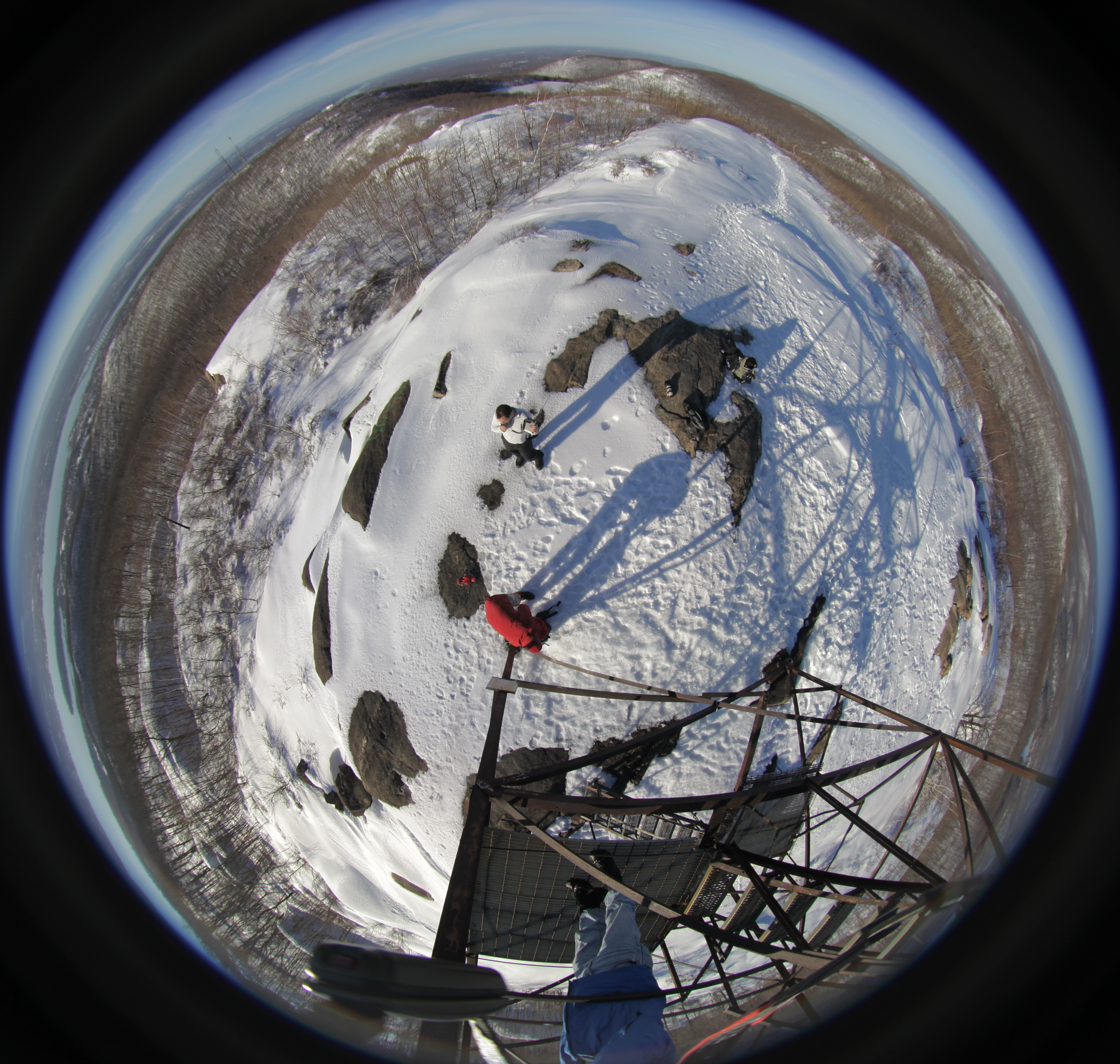
A mountaintop view, shot with the lens pointed nearly straight down
