= Panomorph =

Wide angle lens with better optical parameters

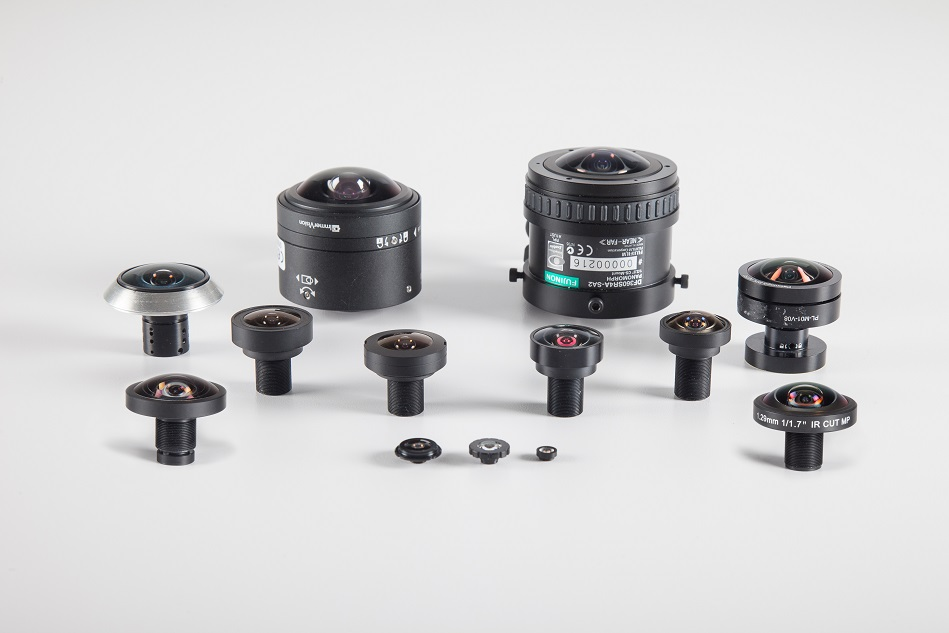
Different panomorph lenses

A panomorph lens is a particular type of wide-angle lens specifically designed to improve optical performances in predefined zones of interest, or across the whole image, compared to traditional fisheye lenses. Some examples of improved optical parameters include the number of pixels, the MTF or the relative illumination.

The term panomorph derives from the Greek words pan meaning all, horama meaning view, and morph meaning form.

== History ==
The origin of panomorph technology dates back to 1999 from a French company named ImmerVision now headquartered in Montreal, Canada. Since the first panomorph lenses have been used in video surveillance applications in the early 2000s, panomorph lenses are an improvement on existing wide-angle lenses in a broad range of applications.

== Technology ==
Traditional wide-angle lenses have significant barrel distortion resulting from the compromise of imaging a wide field of view onto a finite, flat image plane; and non-uniform image quality due to the off-axis optical aberrations increasing with the field angle; and significant relative illumination falloff due to the cosine fourth illumination law. To improve the optical performances of the resulting images in predefined zones of interest or in the whole image, panomorph lenses can use one or many strategies at the optical design stage, including:

- targeted optical distortion, modulated across the field of view, to vary the magnification and increase the number of pixels in the zone of interest.
- optical anamorphosis to create a non-spherical image footprint to better match the sensor anamorphic ratio and increase the total number of imaged pixels in the whole image.
- optimally balanced variegated optical parameters (MTF, magnification, relative illumination) to harmonise the image sensor in specific applications and thus equalize the resulting image quality across the whole image.

The zones of interest or whole image improvements resulting from using any of these design strategies in a given panomorph lenses enable improved optical performances compared to other traditional wide-angle lenses.

== Imaging software ==
No matter the strategies used to improve the performances in zones of interest, each panomorph lens is designed with specific parameters such as the object-to-image mapping function. Precise specifications of these design parameters for each panomorph lens is encoded in their unique RPL (Registered Panomorph Lens) code to allow de-warping algorithms to process the image and properly display the final image. The display is optimized to keep advantage of the improved performance in the zone of interest created by the panomorph lenses as opposed to algorithms for fisheye lenses which employ a linear mapping function to de-warp the image without any considerations for their departure from a perfect linear mapping ($f\theta$ distortion).

== Applications ==
By providing wide-angle images with zones of interest, panomorph lenses are often designed with specific applications in mind. Panomorph lenses have already been used in various industries, including:

- Broadcast television
- Mobile communications
- Virtual reality cameras
- Action cameras
- Wearable cameras
- Security and surveillance
- Automotive
- Endoscopy
- Aerospace
- Drones
