= Fisheye lens =

Wide-angle photographic lens with strong barrel distortion

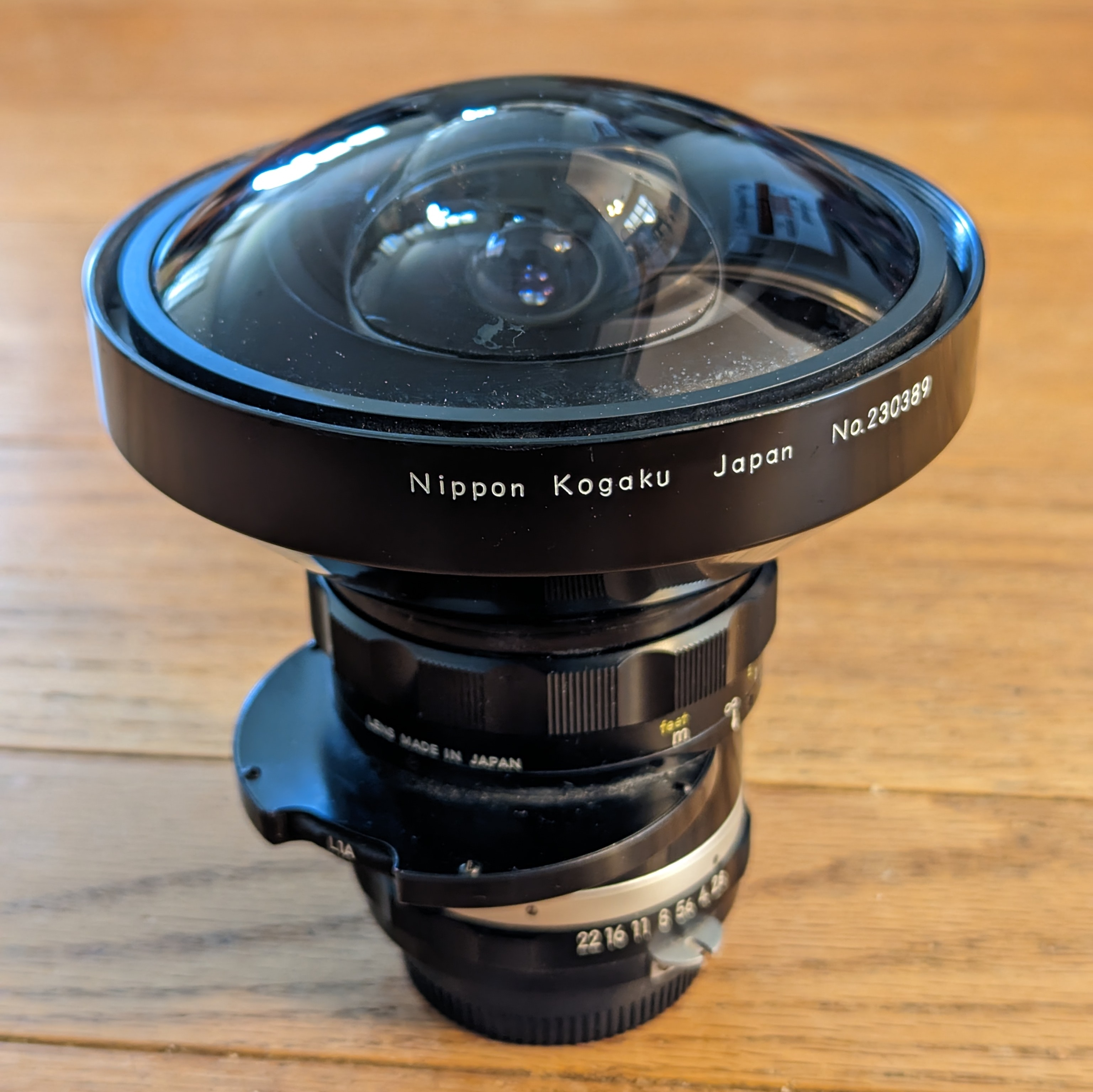
A circular 8 mm fisheye lens for Nikon F-mount

A fisheye lens is an ultra wide-angle lens that produces strong visual distortion intended to create a wide panoramic or hemispherical image. Fisheye lenses achieve extremely wide angles of view, well beyond any rectilinear lens. Instead of producing images with straight lines of perspective (rectilinear images), fisheye lenses use a special mapping ("distortion"; for example: equisolid angle, see below), which gives images a characteristic convex non-rectilinear appearance.

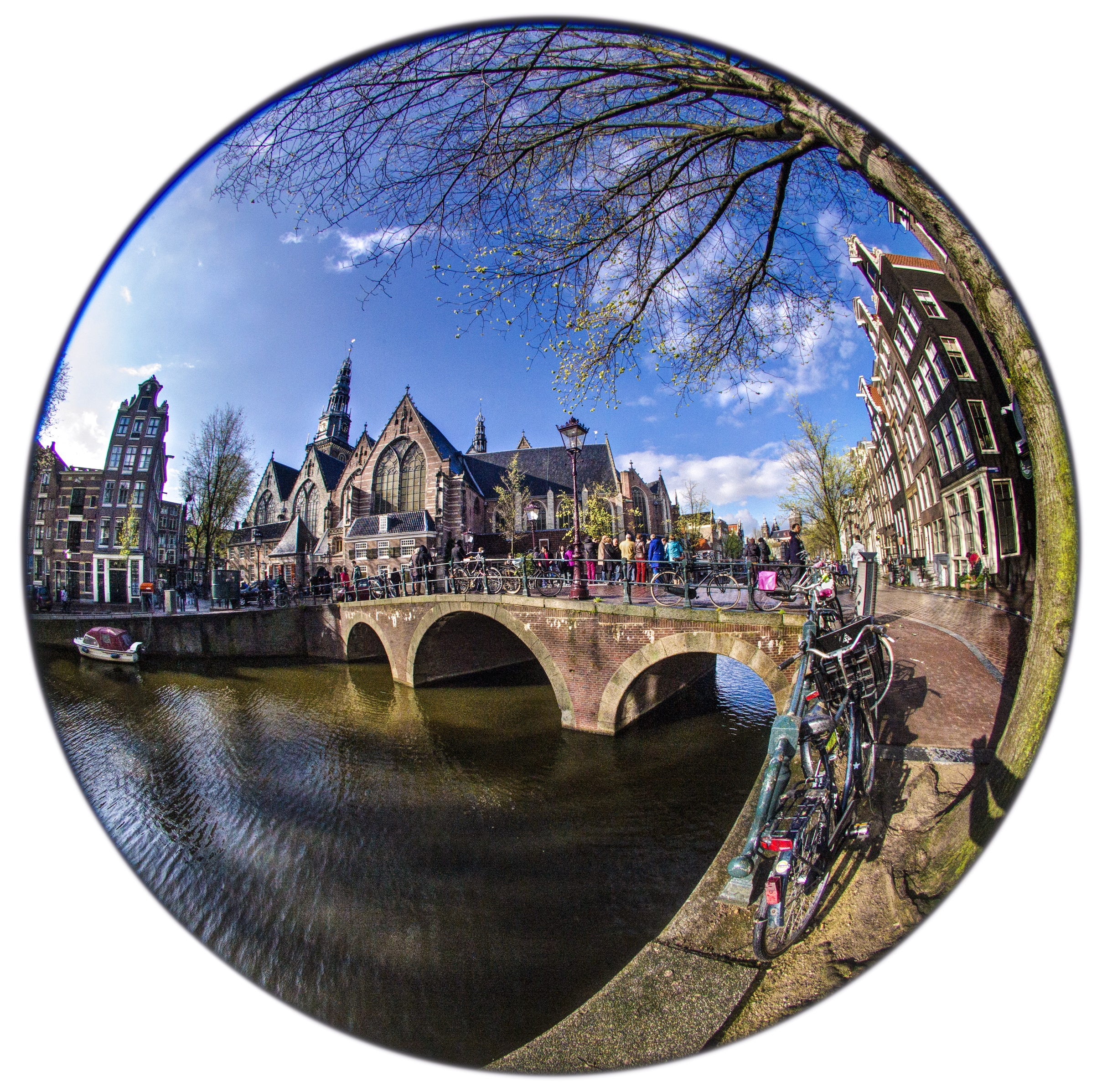
Circular fisheye photograph of Oude Kerk Amsterdam. Chromatic aberration can clearly be seen toward the outer edges.

The term fisheye was coined in 1906 by American physicist and inventor Robert W. Wood based on how a fish would see an ultrawide hemispherical view from beneath the water (a phenomenon known as Snell's window). Their first practical use was in the 1920s for use in meteorology to study cloud formation giving them the name whole-sky lenses. The angle of view of a fisheye lens is usually between 100 and 180 degrees, although lenses covering up to 280 degrees exist (see below). Their focal lengths depend on the film format they are designed for.

Mass-produced fisheye lenses for photography first appeared in the early 1960s and are generally used for their unique, distorted appearance. For the popular 35 mm film format, typical focal lengths of fisheye lenses are 8–10 mm for circular images, and 12–18 mm for diagonal images filling the entire frame. For digital cameras using smaller imagers such as 1/4 in and 1/3 in format CCD or CMOS sensors, the focal length of "miniature" fisheye lenses can be as short as 1–2 mm.

Fisheye lenses also have other applications, such as re-projecting images originally filmed through a fisheye lens, or created via computer-generated graphics, onto hemispherical screens. They are also used for scientific photography, such as recordings of aurora and meteors, and to study plant canopy geometry, and to calculate near-ground solar radiation. In everyday life, they are perhaps most commonly encountered as peephole door viewers to give a wide field of view.

== History and development ==
Panoramas with fisheye distortion predate photography and the fisheye lens. In 1779, Horace Bénédict de Saussure published his downward-facing fisheye view of the Alps: "All the objects are drawn in perspective from the centre".

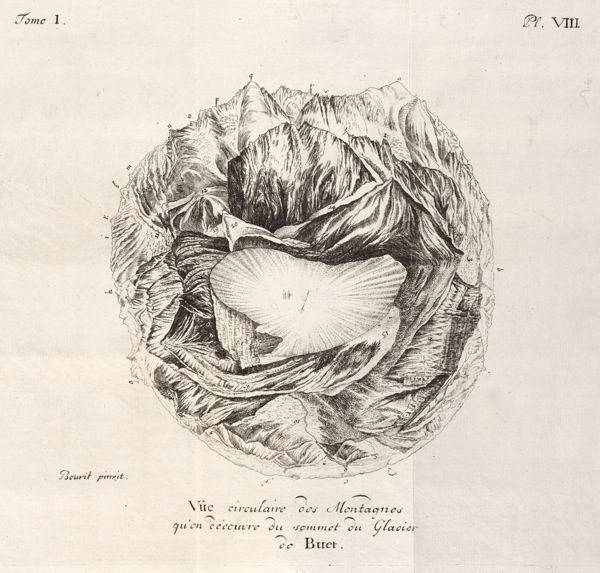
"Vue circulaire des montagnes qu'on découvre du sommet du Glacier de Buet", Horace-Benedict de Saussure

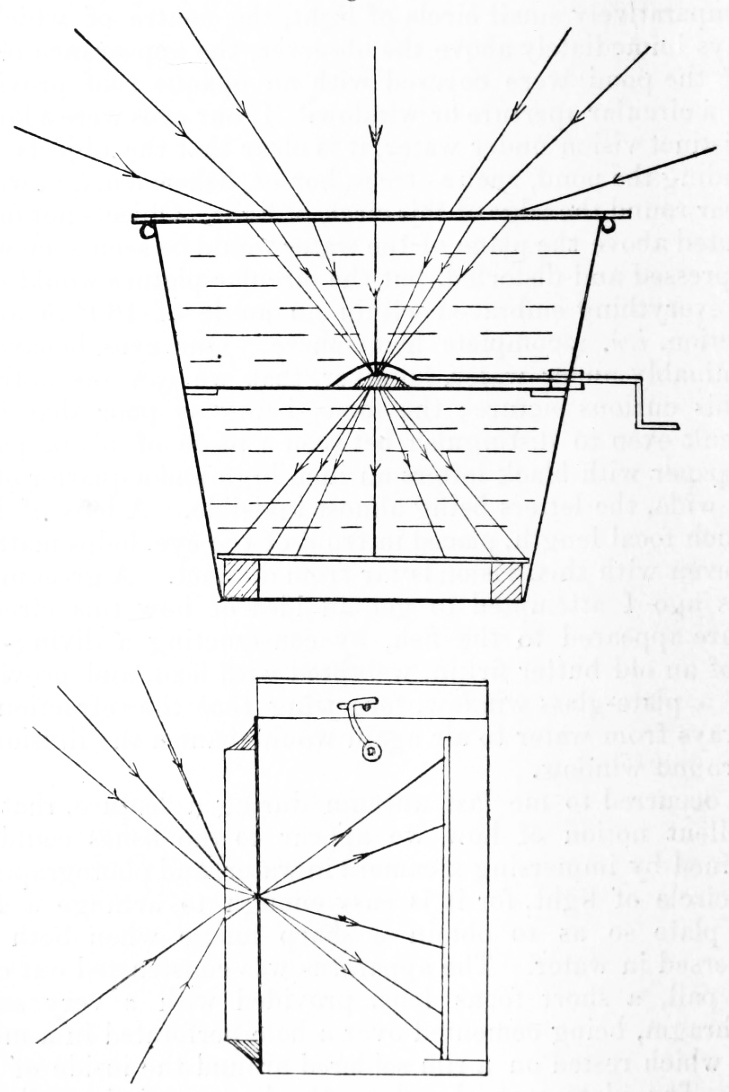
Wood's pail (top) and improved (bottom) camera (1906)

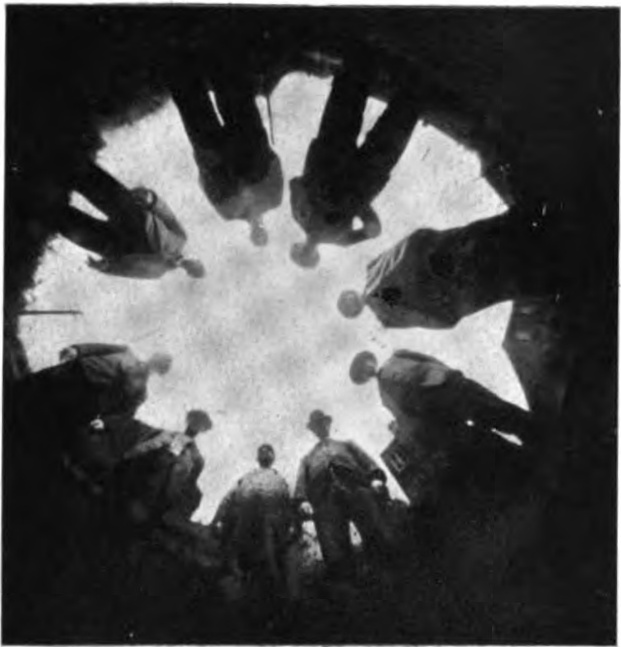
First known fisheye image recorded in 1905 using Wood's pail apparatus (1906)

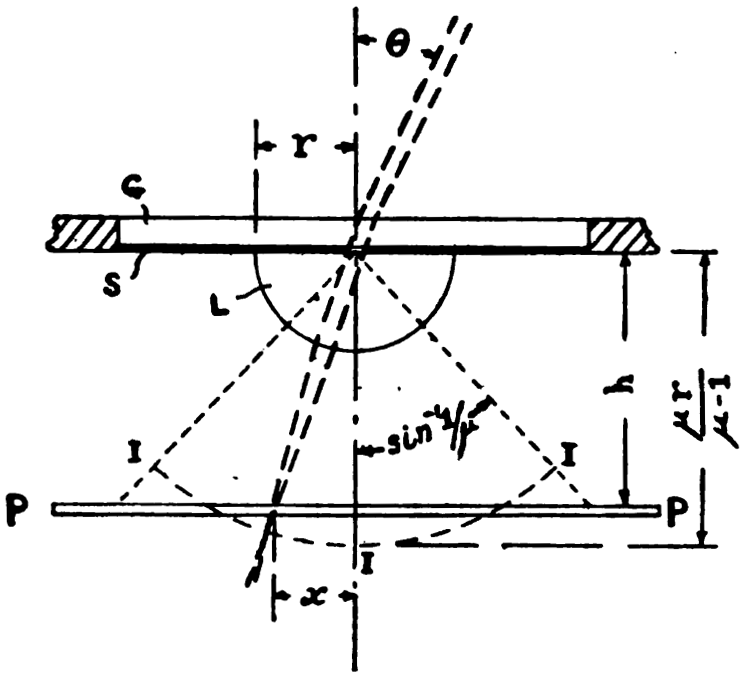
Bond's hemispherical lens (1922)

In 1906, Wood published a paper detailing an experiment in which he built a camera in a water-filled pail starting with a photographic plate at the bottom, a short focus lens with a pinhole diaphragm located approximately halfway up the pail, and a sheet of glass at the rim to suppress ripples in the water. The experiment was Wood's attempt "to ascertain how the external world appears to the fish" and hence the title of the paper was "Fish-Eye Views, and Vision under Water". Wood subsequently built an improved "horizontal" version of the camera omitting the lens, instead using a pinhole pierced in the side of a tank, which was filled with water and a photographic plate. In the text, he described a third "Fish-Eye" camera built using sheet brass, the primary advantages being that this one was more portable than the other two cameras, and was "absolutely leaktight". In his conclusion, Wood thought that "the device will photograph the entire sky [so] a sunshine recorder could be made on this principle, which would require no adjustment for latitude or month" but also wryly noted "the views used for the illustration of this paper savour somewhat of the 'freak' pictures of the magazines."

W.N. Bond described an improvement to Wood's apparatus in 1922 which replaced the tank of water with a simple hemispheric glass lens, making the camera significantly more portable. The focal length depended on the refractive index and radius of the hemispherical lens, and the maximum aperture was approximately f/50; it was not corrected for chromatic aberration and projected a curved field onto a flat plate. Bond noted the new lens could be used to record cloud cover or lightning strikes at a given location. Bond's hemispheric lens also reduced the need for a pinhole aperture to ensure sharp focus, so exposure times were also reduced.

=== Hill Sky Lens ===
Hill/Beck Sky Lens (1923, GB 225,398)

In 1924, Robin Hill first described a lens with 180° coverage that had been used for a cloud survey in September 1923 The lens, designed by Hill and R. & J. Beck, Ltd., was patented in December 1923. The Hill Sky Lens is now credited as the first fisheye lens. Hill also described three different mapping functions of a lens designed to capture an entire hemisphere (stereographic, equidistant, and orthographic). Distortion is unavoidable in a lens that encompasses an angle of view exceeding 125°, but Hill and Beck claimed in the patent that stereographic or equidistant projection were the preferred mapping functions. The three-element, three-group lens design uses a highly divergent meniscus lens as the first element to bring in light over a wide view followed by a converging lens system to project the view onto a flat photographic plate.

The Hill Sky Lens was fitted to a whole sky camera, typically used in a pair separated by 500 metres (1,600 ft) for stereo imaging, and equipped with a red filter for contrast; in its original form, the lens had a focal length of 0.84 in (21 mm) and cast an image 2.5 in (64 mm) in diameter at f/8. Conrad Beck described the camera system in an article published in 1925. At least one has been reconstructed.

=== German and Japanese development ===
Schulz/AEG Weitwinkelobjektiv (1932, DE 620538)

In 1932, the German firm Allgemeine Elektricitäts-Gesellschaft AG (AEG) filed for a patent on the Weitwinkelobjektiv (wide-angle lens), a 5-element, 4-group development of the Hill Sky Lens. Compared to the 1923 Hill Sky Lens, the 1932 Weitwinkelobjektiv featured two diverging meniscus elements ahead of the stop and used a cemented achromatic group in the converging section. Miyamoto credits Hans Schulz with the design of the Weitwinkelobjektiv. The basic patented design was produced for cloud recording as a 17 mm f/6.3 lens, and Umbo used the AEG lens for artistic purposes, with photographs published in a 1937 issue of Volk und Welt.

The AEG Weitwinkelobjektiv formed the basis of the later Nippon Kogaku (Nikon) Fisheye-Nikkor 16 mm f/8 lens of 1938, which was used for military and scientific (cloud cover) purposes. Nikon, which had a contract to supply optics to the Imperial Japanese Navy, possibly gained access to the AEG design under the Pact of Steel.

Richter/Zeiss Pleon (1938, US 2,247,068)

Also in 1938, Robert Richter of Carl Zeiss AG patented the 6-element, 5-group Pleon lens, which was used for aerial surveillance during World War II. The converging rear group of the Pleon was symmetrical, derived from the 4-element Topogon lens designed by Richter for Zeiss in 1933. Testing on a captured lens after the war showed the Pleon provided an equidistant projection to cover a field of approximately 130°, and negatives were printed using a special rectifying enlarger to eliminate distortion. The Pleon had a focal length of approximately 72.5 mm with a maximum aperture of f/8 and used a plano-concave front element 300 mm (12 in) in diameter; the image on the negative was approximately 85 mm (3.3 in) in diameter.

=== 35 mm development ===
Merté/Zeiss Sphaerogon (1935, DE 672 393 and US 2,126,126)

At approximately the same time that Schulz was developing the Weitwinkelobjektiv at AEG, Willy Merté at Zeiss was developing the Sphaerogon, which was also designed to encompass a 180° field of view. Unlike the Weitwinkelobjektiv, Merté's Sphaerogon was not limited to medium format cameras; prototype versions of the Sphaerogon were constructed for the Contax I miniature format camera. The first prototype Sphaerogon lenses constructed had a maximum aperture of f/8, but later examples were computed half a stop faster, to f/6.8. Several prototype examples of Sphaerogon lenses were recovered as part of the Zeiss Lens Collection seized by the Army Signal Corps as war reparations in 1945; the collection, which the Zeiss firm had retained as a record of their designs, was later documented by Merté, the former head of optical computation for CZJ, working under Signal Corps officer Edward Kaprelian.

After the war, the Fisheye-Nikkor lens was mated to a medium format camera and was produced in slightly modified form (focal length increased slightly to 16.3 mm) as the "Sky-image Recording Camera" in March 1957 for the Japanese government, followed by a commercial release as the Nikon Fisheye Camera (also known as the "Nikon Sky Camera" or "Nikon Cloud Camera") in September 1960, which had a retail price of ¥200,000 (equivalent to ¥1,230,000 in 2024). The revised lens created a circular image 50 mm (2.0 in) in diameter and covered a complete hemispherical field of 180°. Only 30 examples of the Nikon Fisheye Camera were manufactured, and of those, 18 were sold to customers, mainly in the United States; Nikon likely destroyed the remaining stock to avoid tax penalties. Photographs taken with the Fisheye Camera that were published in Life in 1957 marked the first wide exposure of the public to fisheye distortion; including a photograph of the United States Senate caucus room, taken by Ed Clark and published in an April 1957 issue, and a photograph of pole vaulter Bob Gutowski taken by Ralph Crane, published in July 1957.

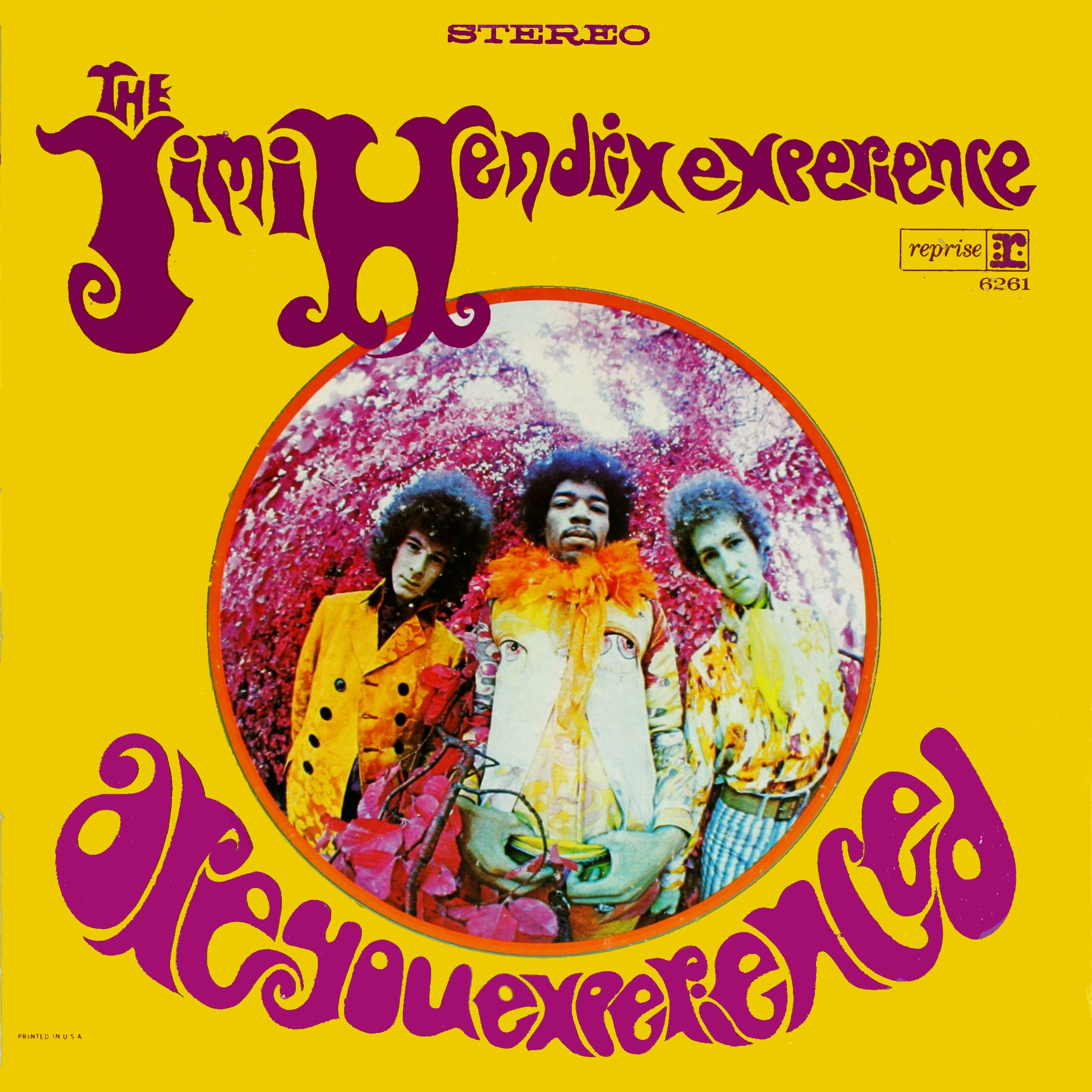
Album cover of Are You Experienced (1967) by The Jimi Hendrix Experience, featuring the trio photographed using a fisheye lens

The Nikon Fisheye Camera was discontinued in September 1961, and Nikon subsequently introduced the first regular production fisheye lens for 35 mm cameras in 1962, the Fisheye-Nikkor 8 mm f/8, which required the reflex mirror on its Nikon F and Nikkormat cameras to be locked up prior to mounting the lens. Prior to the early 1960s, fisheye lenses were used primarily by professional and scientific photographers, but the advent of the fisheye for the 35 mm format increased its popular use. The Fisheye-Nikkor 8 mm f/8 has a field of view of 180° and uses 9 elements in 5 groups; it has a fixed focus and built-in filters intended for black-and-white photography. Research indicates that fewer than 1,400 lenses were built. As fisheye lenses became more widely available, the distinctive distortion grew in popularity, especially for album covers. For example, British fashion photographer Tim Walker used a fisheye lens to capture the cover of Harry Styles' 2019 pop/rock album, Fine Line. Other genres that have taken advantage of the fisheye lens look include punk rock, hip-hop, and skateboarding videos. In particular, the fisheye lens became a signature style of music video director Hype Williams, especially in the mid-to-late 1990s when he directed videos for artists such as Busta Rhymes, Missy Elliott, and Puff Daddy.

Isshiki & Matsuki/Nikon Fisheye-Nikkor 6 mm f/5.6 (US 3,542,697)

Nikon subsequently released several more milestone circular fisheye lenses in Nikon F mount through the 1960s and 70s:

- 10 mm f/5.6 OP (1968), the first fisheye to feature orthographic projection, which was also the first lens to feature an aspherical element
- 6 mm f/5.6 (1969), the first fisheye to feature a 220° field of view; the patent accompanying this lens includes a design for a lens with a 270° field of view. A 6.2 mm f/5.6 SAP fisheye was later produced in limited numbers with an aspherical surface, encompassing a 230° field of view.
- 8 mm f/2.8 (1970), the first circular fisheye with variable focus, automatic aperture, and reflex viewing (mirror lock-up no longer required).

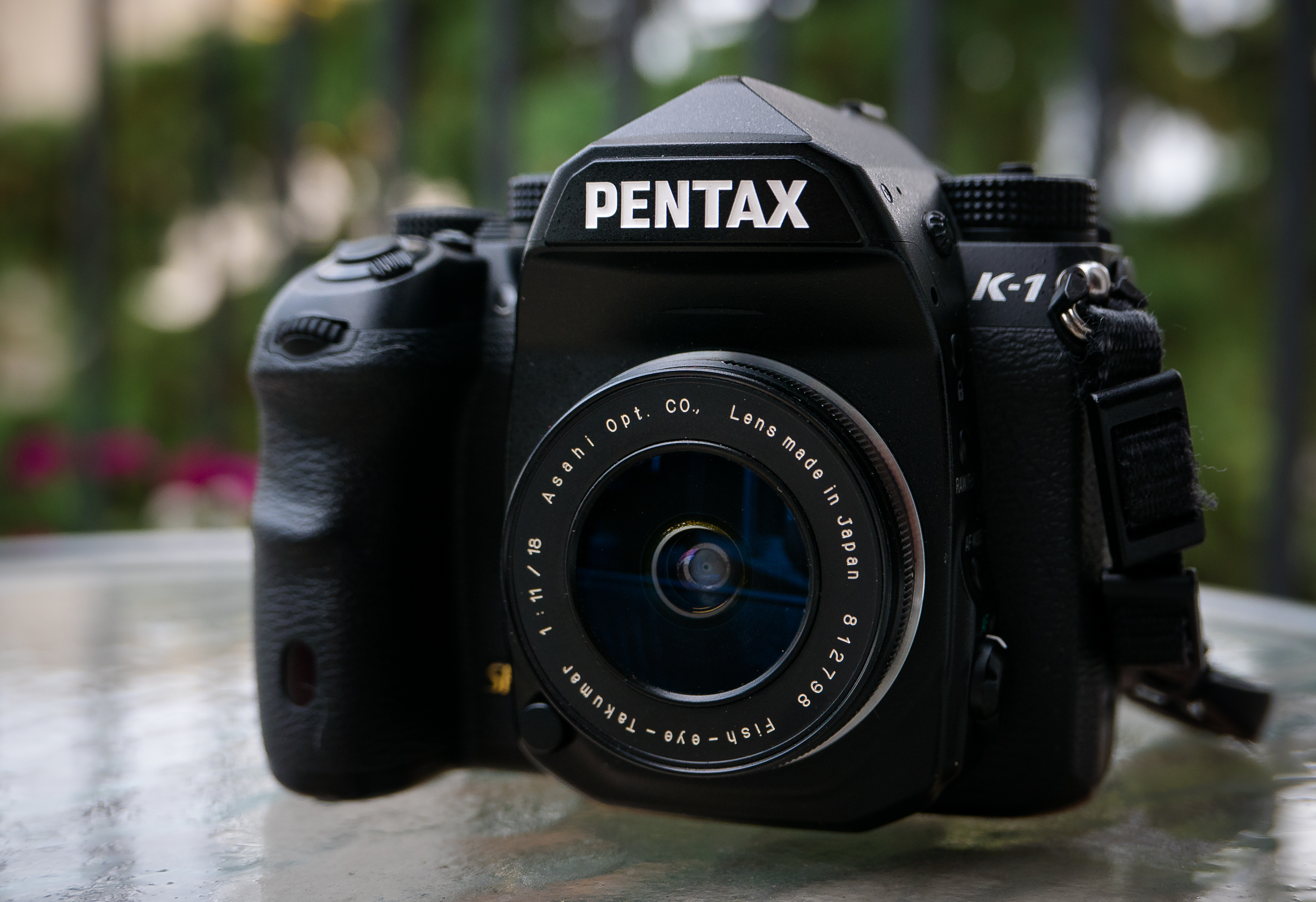
Fish-eye Takumar 11/18mm on a modern Pentax K-1 DSLR

Contemporaneously, other Japanese manufacturers were developing the so-called "full-frame" or diagonal fisheyes, which captured approximately a 180° field of view across the diagonal of the film frame. The first such diagonal fisheye was the Fish-eye Takumar 18 mm f/11, released by Pentax (Asahi Optical) in 1962, followed by the slightly faster UW Rokkor-PG 18 mm f/9.5 from Minolta in 1966. Both of these were reflex-viewing and fixed-focus. Both Pentax and Minolta followed up with faster lenses with variable focus in 1967 (Super Fish-eye-Takumar 17 mm f/4) and 1969 (Rokkor-OK 16 mm f/2.8), respectively. The 16 mm Rokkor was later adopted by Leica as the Fisheye-Elmarit-R (1974) for its SLRs and then converted to autofocus (1986) for the Alpha system. As of 2018, the same basic optical design is still sold as the Sony SAL16F28.

== Design ==
Unlike rectilinear lenses, fisheye lenses are not fully characterised by focal length and aperture alone. Angle of view, image diameter, projection type, and sensor coverage all vary independently of these.

=== Image diameter and coverage ===
Types of using format
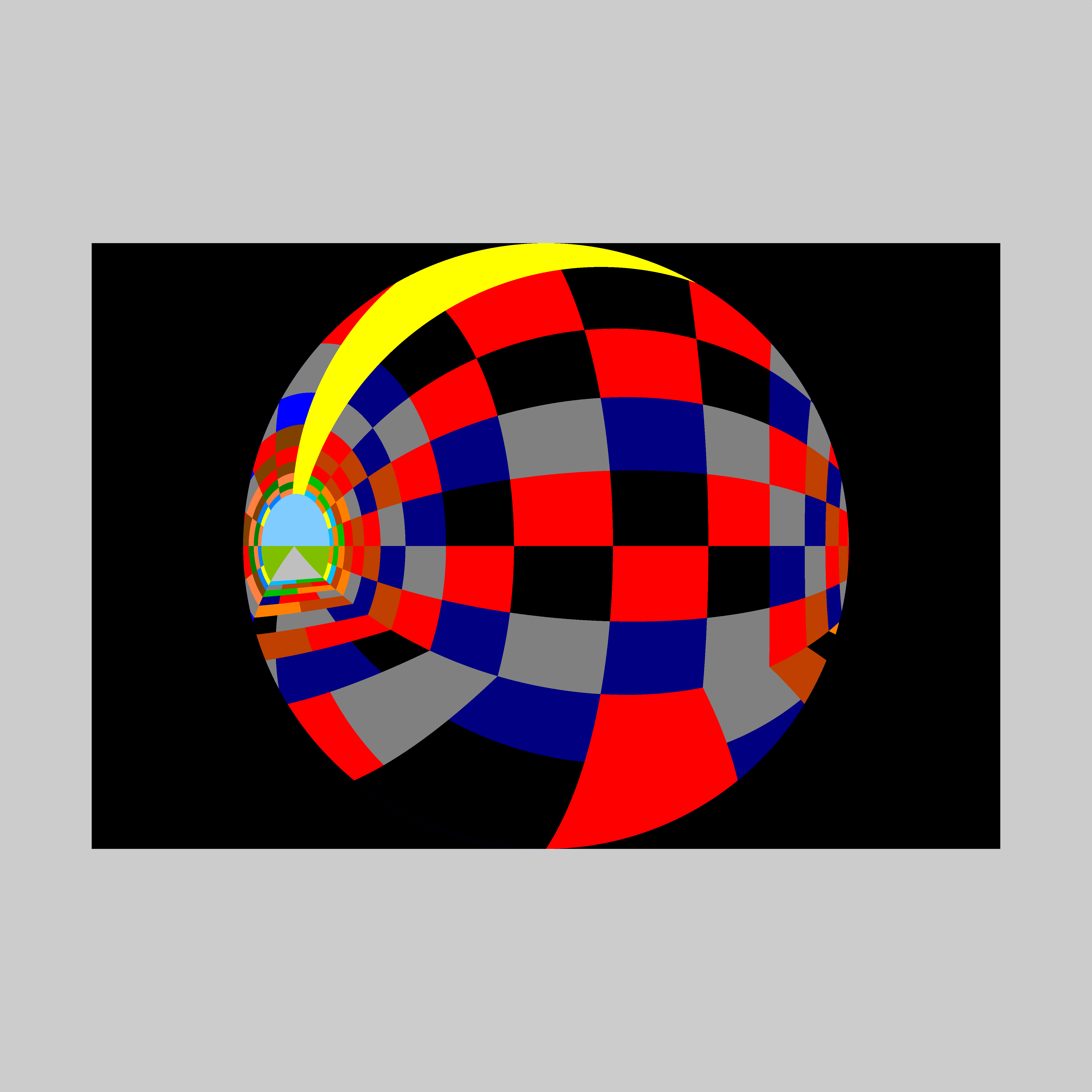
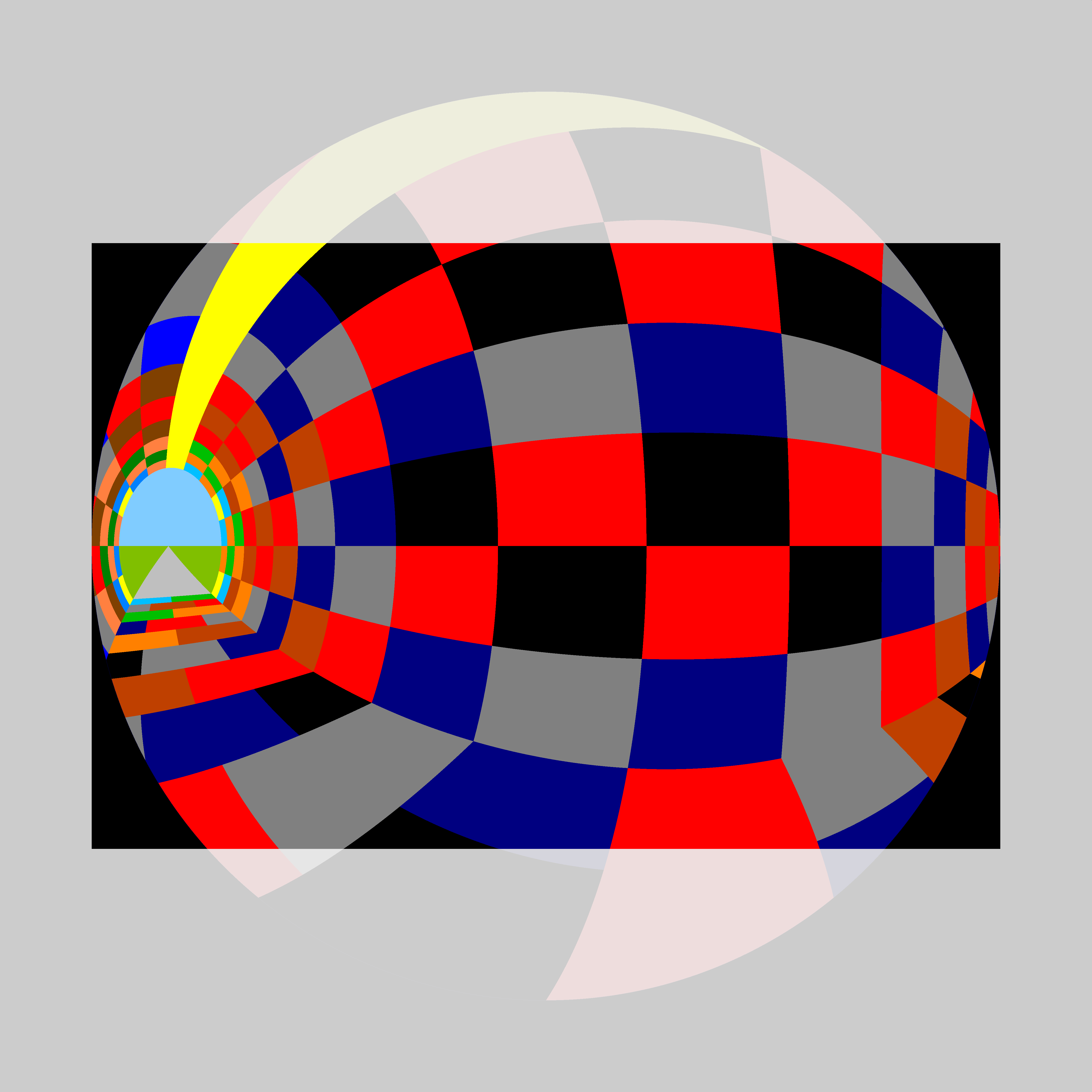
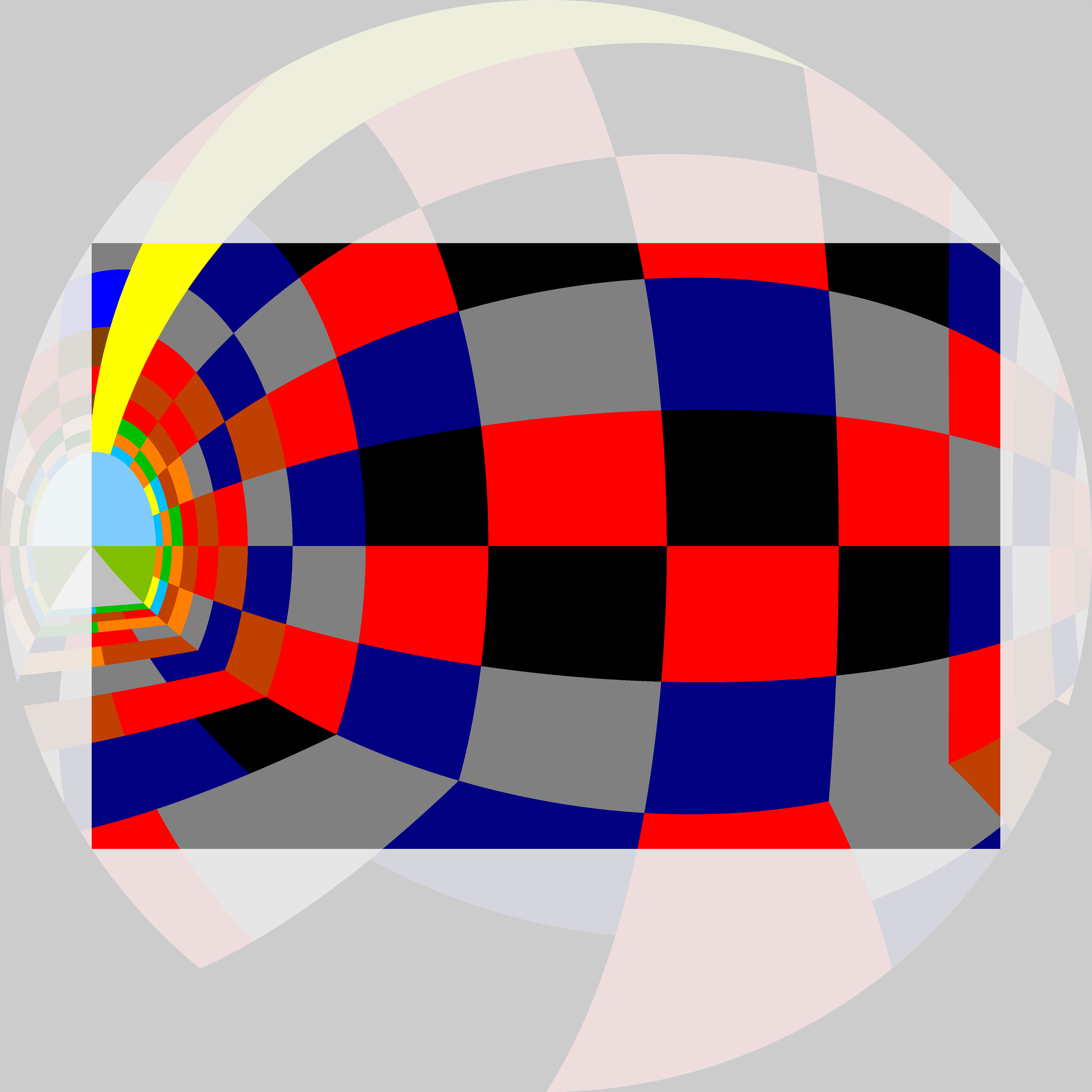
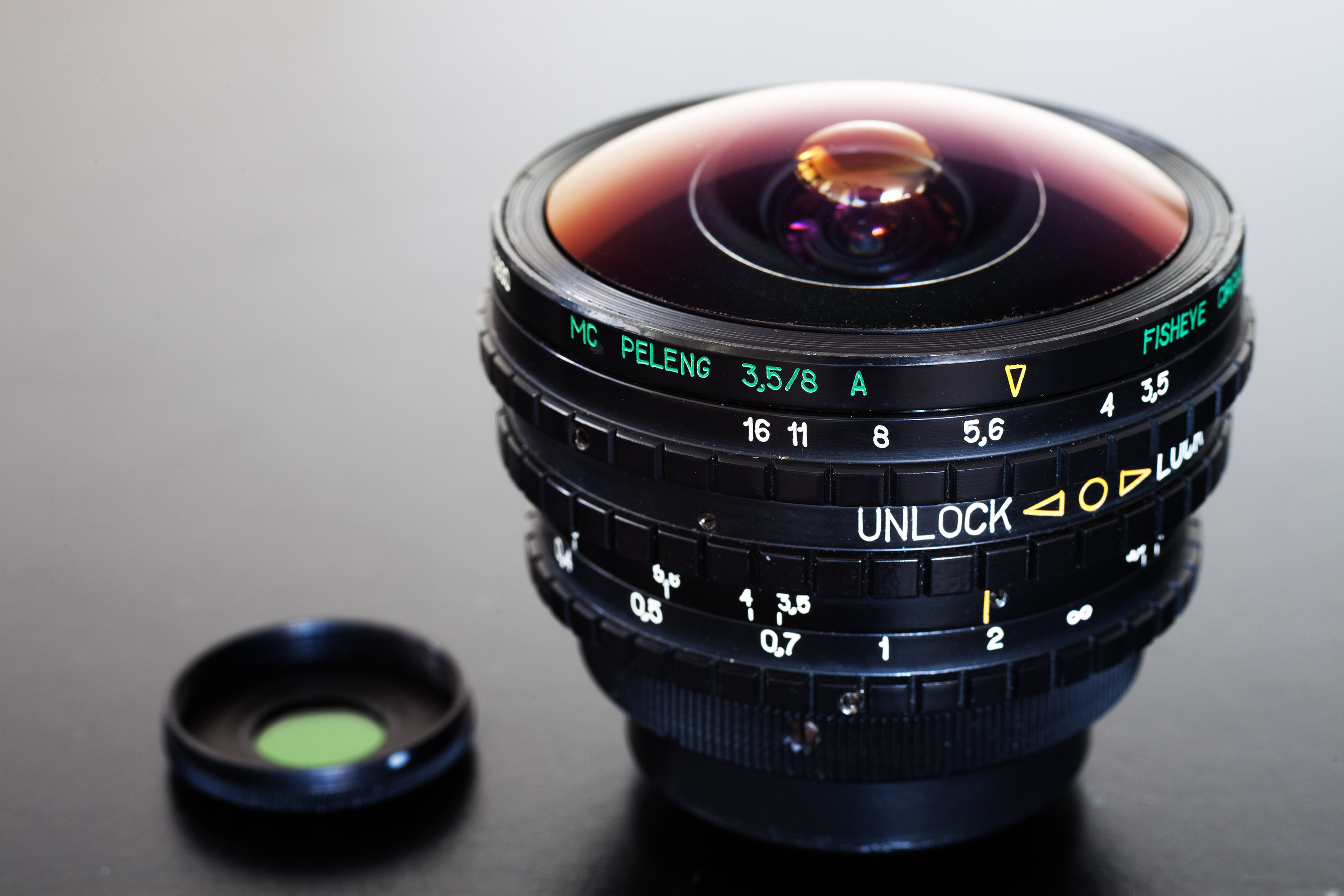
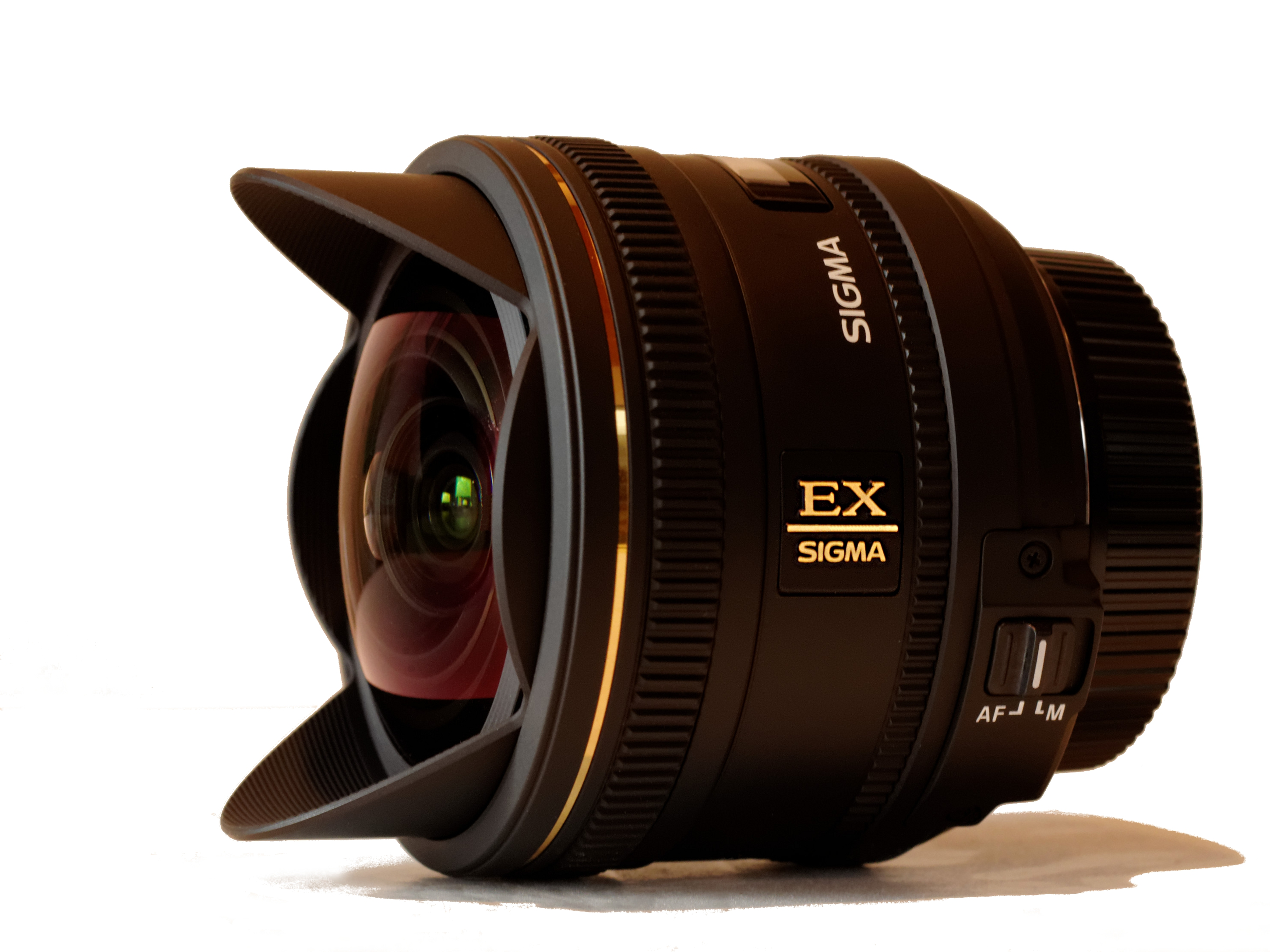
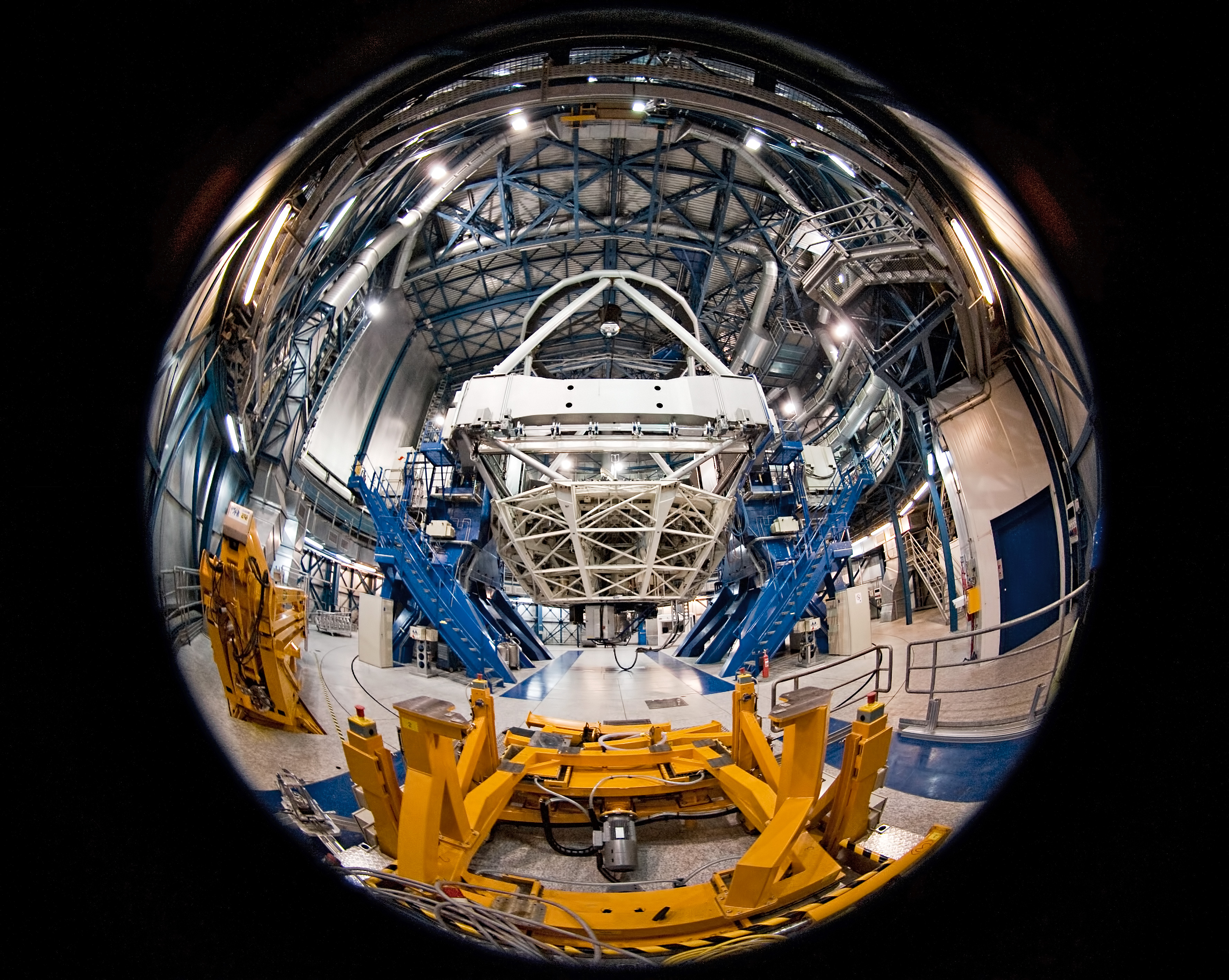
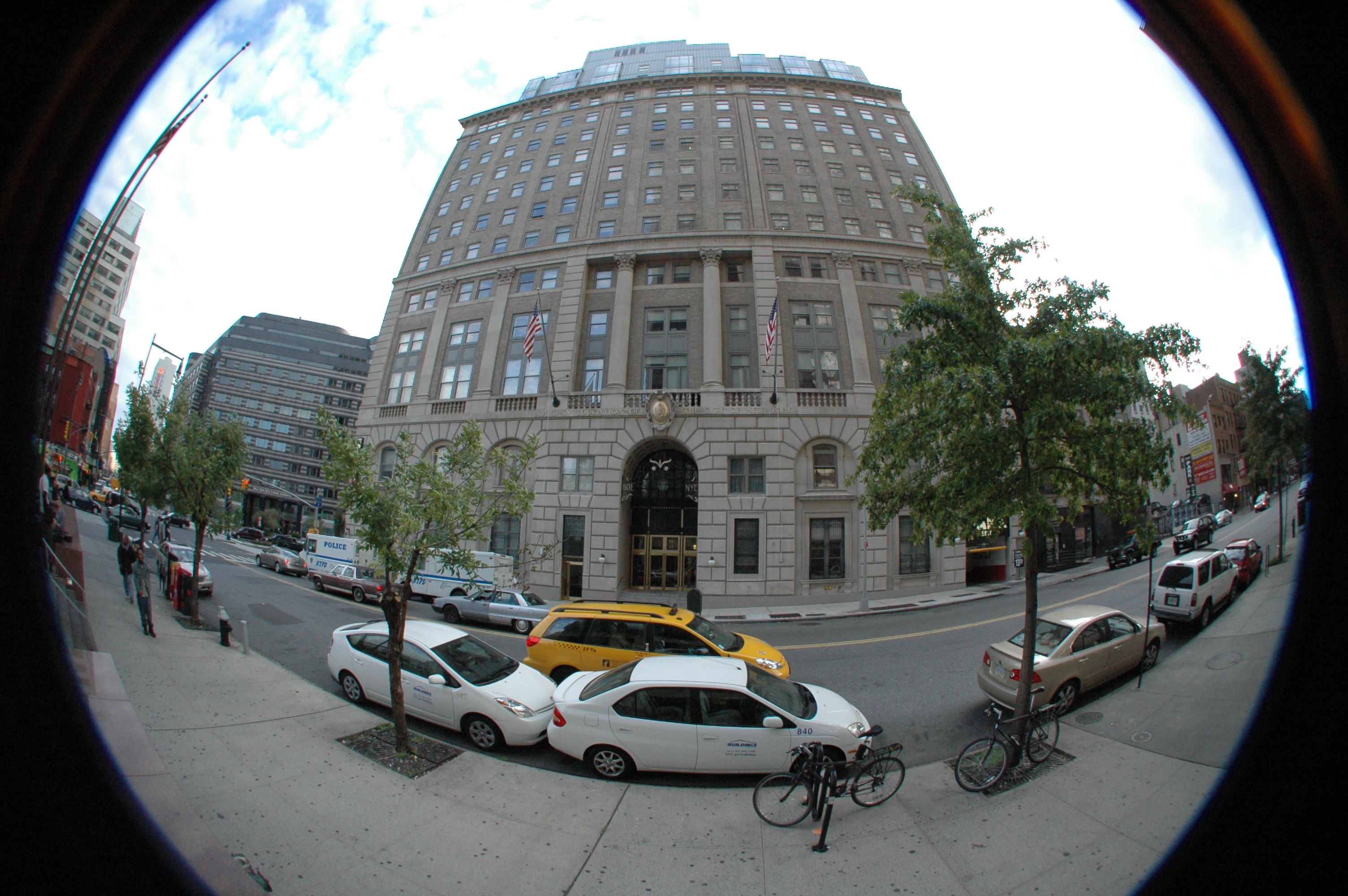
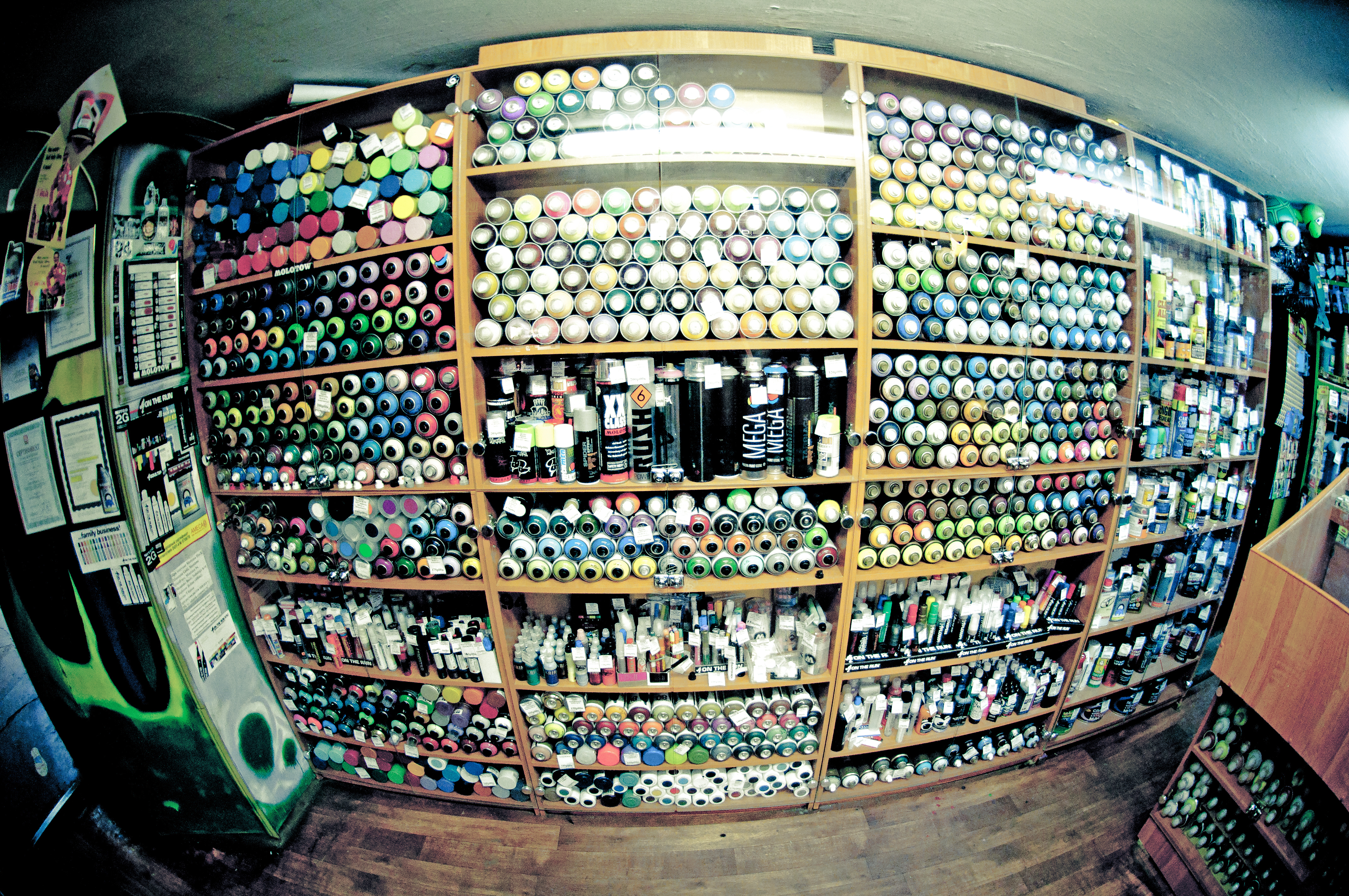
| Circular | | Cropped circle | Full-frame |
|---|---|---|---|
| 3:2 | 52% sensor | 78% FOV, 92% sensor | 59% FOV |
| 4:3 | 59% sensor | 86% FOV, 90% sensor | 61% FOV |
| Circular fisheye for 35 mm | | | Full-frame fisheye with rudimentary lens hood |
| ESO's VLT image taken with a circular fisheye lens. | | 35 mm circular fisheye with DX-format-camera | Diagonal fisheye used in a closed space (Nikkor 10.5 mm) |

In a circular fisheye lens, the image circle is inscribed in the film or sensor area; in a diagonal ("full-frame") fisheye lens, the image circle is circumscribed around the film or sensor area. This implies that using a fisheye lens for a different format than it was intended for is easy (as opposed to a rectilinear lens), and may change its characteristic.

Further, different fisheye lenses map ("distort") images differently, and the manner of distortion is referred to as their mapping function. A common type for consumer use is equisolid angle.

Although there are digital fisheye effects available both in-camera and as computer software, neither can extend the angle of view of the original images to the very large one of a true fisheye lens.

=== Focal length ===
The focal length is determined by the angular coverage, the specific mapping function used, and the required dimensions of the final image. Focal lengths for popular amateur camera sizes are computed as:

Calculated fisheye focal lengths, (Note: Assumes 180° maximum angle of view for the mapping function, $\theta=\frac{\pi}{2}$) (millimeters)
| Inverse mapping function | | Stereographic | Equidistant | Equisolid angle | Orthographic |
| Inverse mapping function | | $f = {r \over 2} \cot {\theta \over 2}$ | $f = {r \over \theta}$ | $f = {r \over 2} \csc {\theta \over 2}$ | $f = r \csc {\theta}$ |
|---|---|---|---|---|---|
| Circular (Note: For circular fisheyes, the maximum dimension r is half the length of the shortest side.) | APS-C (r = 8.4 mm) | 4.2 | 5.3 | 5.9 | 8.4 |
| Circular | 135 (r = 12 mm) | 6.0 | 7.6 | 8.5 | 12.0 |
| Circular | 6 × 6 (r = 28 mm) | 14.0 | 17.8 | 19.8 | 28.0 |
| Diagonal (Note: For full-frame fisheyes, the maximum dimension r is half the length of the diagonal.) | APS-C (r = 15.1 mm) | 7.5 | 9.6 | 10.6 | 15.1 |
| Diagonal | 135 (r = 21.7 mm) | 10.8 | 13.8 | 15.3 | 21.7 |
| Diagonal | 6 × 6 (r = 39.6 mm) | 19.8 | 25.2 | 28.0 | 39.6 |

=== Circular fisheyes ===
The first types of fisheye lenses developed were "circular" — lenses which took in a 180° hemisphere and projected it as a circle within the film frame. By design, circular fisheye lenses thus cover a smaller image circle than rectilinear lenses designed for the same sensor size. The corners of a circular fisheye image will be completely black. This blackness is different from the gradual vignetting of rectilinear lenses and sets on abruptly.

Some circular fisheyes were available in orthographic projection models for scientific applications. These have a 180° vertical, horizontal and diagonal angle of view.

For APS and m43 cameras, several lenses have emerged that retain a 180° field of view on a crop body. The first of these was the Sigma 4.5 mm. Sunex also makes a 5.6 mm fisheye lens that captures a circular 185° field of view on a 1.5x Nikon and 1.6x Canon DSLR cameras.

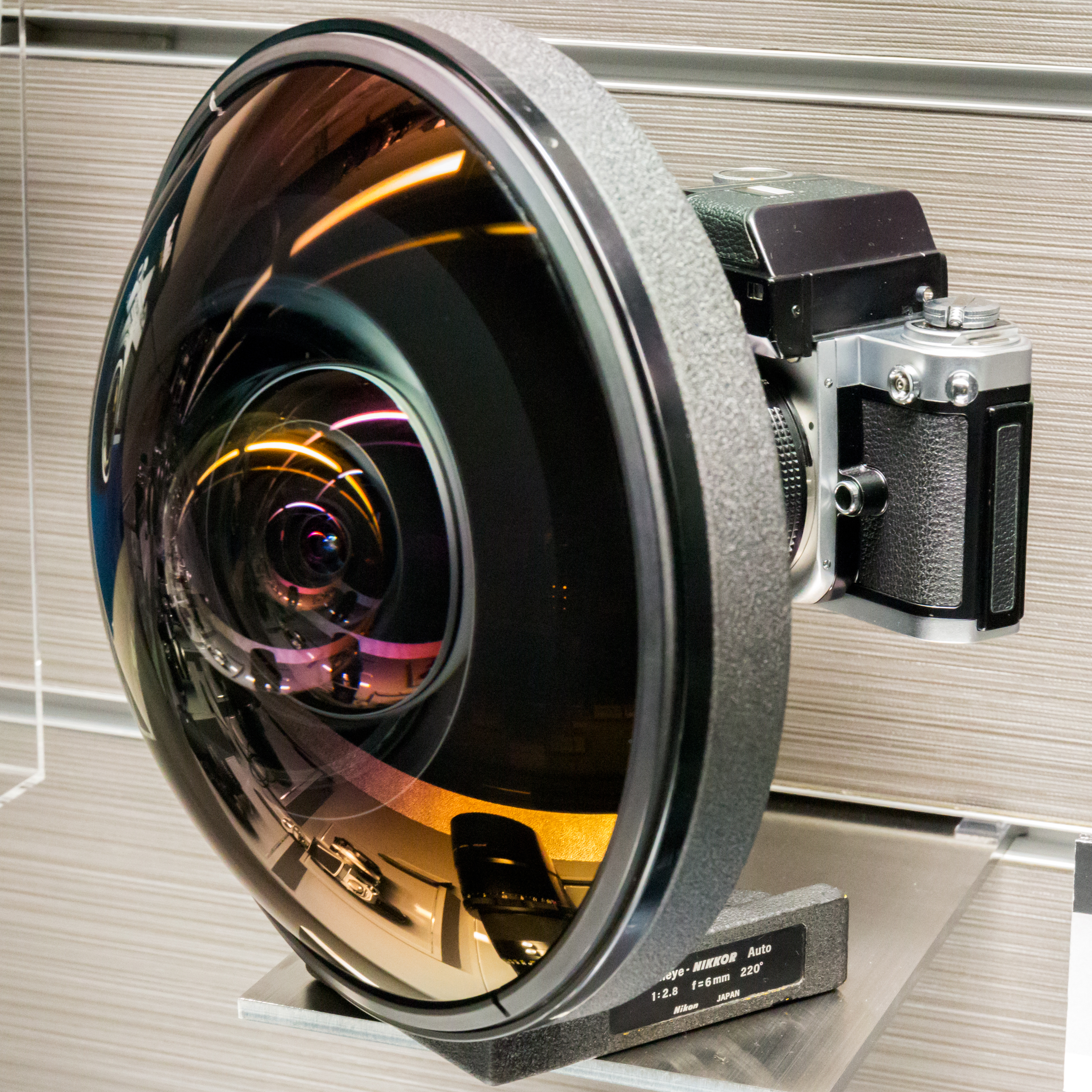
Fisheye-Nikkor 6mm f/2.8 mounted on a Nikon F2 in the Nikon Museum.

Nikon produced a 6 mm circular fisheye lens for 35 mm film that was initially designed for an expedition to Antarctica. It featured a 220° field of view, designed to capture the entire sky and surrounding ground when pointed straight up. This lens is no longer manufactured, and is used nowadays to produce interactive virtual-reality images such as QuickTime VR and IPIX. Because of its very wide field of view, it is very large — weighing 5.2 kilograms (11 lb), having a diameter of 236 millimetres (9.3 in), a length of 171 millimetres (6.7 in) and an angle of view of 220 degrees. It dwarfs a regular 35 mm SLR camera and has its own tripod mounting point, a feature normally seen in large long-focus or telephoto lenses to reduce strain on the lens mount. The lens is extremely rare.

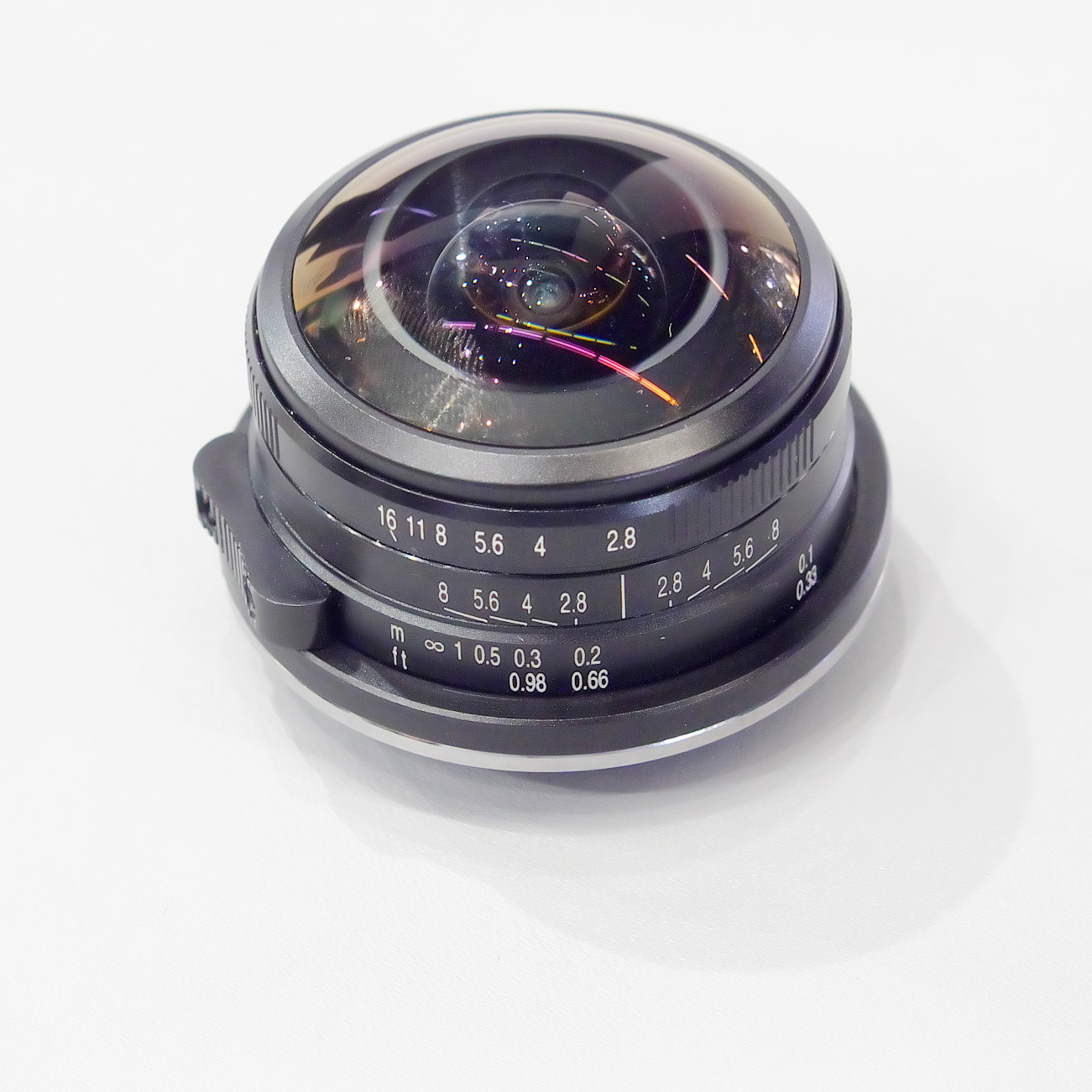
The fish eye lens Laowa 4 mm f/2,8 of the manufacturer Venus Optics

More recently, the Japanese manufacturer Entaniya offers several fisheye lenses with angles of view up to 250° on 35 mm full frame, and up to 280° on smaller sensors (see list below), intended for use in virtual reality applications. In 2018, Venus Optics introduced a 210° fisheye lens for the Micro Four Thirds system.

The 8 mm and 7.5 mm circular fisheye lenses made by Nikon have proven useful for scientific purposes because of their equidistant (equiangular) projection, in which distance along the radius of the circular image is proportional to the zenith angle.

=== Diagonal fisheyes (a.k.a. full-frame or rectangular) ===
As fisheye lenses gained popularity in general photography, camera companies began manufacturing fisheye lenses with an enlarged image circle to cover the entire rectangular film frame. They are called diagonal, or sometimes "rectangular" or "full-frame", fisheyes. (This was well before digital photography, so the use of the term "full frame" with respect to fisheyes has nothing to do with the use of the term to designate a digital sensor measuring 36x24 mm).

The angle of view produced by diagonal fisheyes only measures 180° from corner to corner: they have a 180° diagonal angle of view (AOV), while the horizontal and vertical angles of view will be smaller. For an equisolid angle 15 mm full-frame fisheye, the horizontal AOV will be 147°, and the vertical AOV will be 94°.

One of the first diagonal fisheye lenses to be mass-produced was the Nikon Fisheye-Nikkor F 16mm f/3.5, made in the early 1970s.

To obtain the same effect on digital cameras with smaller sensors, shorter focal lengths are required. Nikon makes a 10.5 mm fisheye for their APS DX SLRs. Several other companies make "full frame", i.e. diagonal, fisheyes for APS and m43 cameras, see next paragraph.

=== Portrait or cropped-circle fisheyes ===
An intermediate between a diagonal and a circular fisheye consists of a circular image optimised for the width of the film format rather than the height. As a result, on any non-square film format, the circular image will be cropped at the top and bottom, but still show black edges on the left and right. This format is called a "portrait" fisheye; historically, it has been rather rare – only the 12 mm f/8 Accura lens (see list below) directly follows the portrait principle. Today however, a portrait fisheye effect is easily achieved by using a fisheye lens intended for full coverage of a smaller sensor format, like an APS diagonal fisheye on a 35 mm full frame camera, or an m43 diagonal fisheye on APS.

=== Miniature fisheye lenses ===
Miniature digital cameras, especially when used as security cameras, often tend to have fisheye lenses to maximize coverage. Miniature fisheye lenses are designed for small-format CCD/CMOS imagers commonly used in consumer and security cameras. Popular image sensor format sizes used include 1/4", 1/3", and 1/2". Depending on the active area of the image sensor, the same lens can form a circular image on a larger image sensor (e.g. 1/2"), and a full frame on a smaller one (e.g. 1/4").

== Examples and specific models ==
For a comprehensive list of all current and all past fisheye lenses, see External Links below.

=== Noteworthy fisheye lenses for APS-C cameras ===
The APS-C image sensor used in Canon cameras is 22.3 mm × 14.9 mm, or 26.82 mm on the diagonal, which is slightly smaller than the sensor size used by other popular manufacturers of cameras with APS-C sensors, such as Fuji, Minolta, Nikon, Pentax, and Sony. The other common APS-C sensors are 23.6–23.7 mm on the long dimension and 15.6 mm on the shorter side, for a diagonal dimension of 28.2–28.4 mm.

==== Circular APS-C fisheye lenses ====
- Sigma 4.5 mm f/2.8
- Lensbaby 5.8 mm f/3.5

==== Diagonal APS-C fisheye lenses ====
- Nikon 10.5 mm f/2.8 for Nikon F DSLRs
- Samyang 8 mm f/3.5 for various APS DSLRs. Notable for its stereographic projection.
- Samyang 8 mm f/2.8 for various mirrorless mounts. Notable for its stereographic projection.
- Sigma 10 mm f/2.8 for various APS DSLRs.

==== Zoom APS-C fisheye lenses ====
- Pentax 10–17 mm f/3.5–4.5 / Tokina 10–17 mm f/3.5–4.5 (jointly developed) for various APS DSLRs.

=== Noteworthy fisheye lenses for 35 mm full frame cameras ===
==== Circular fisheye lenses ====
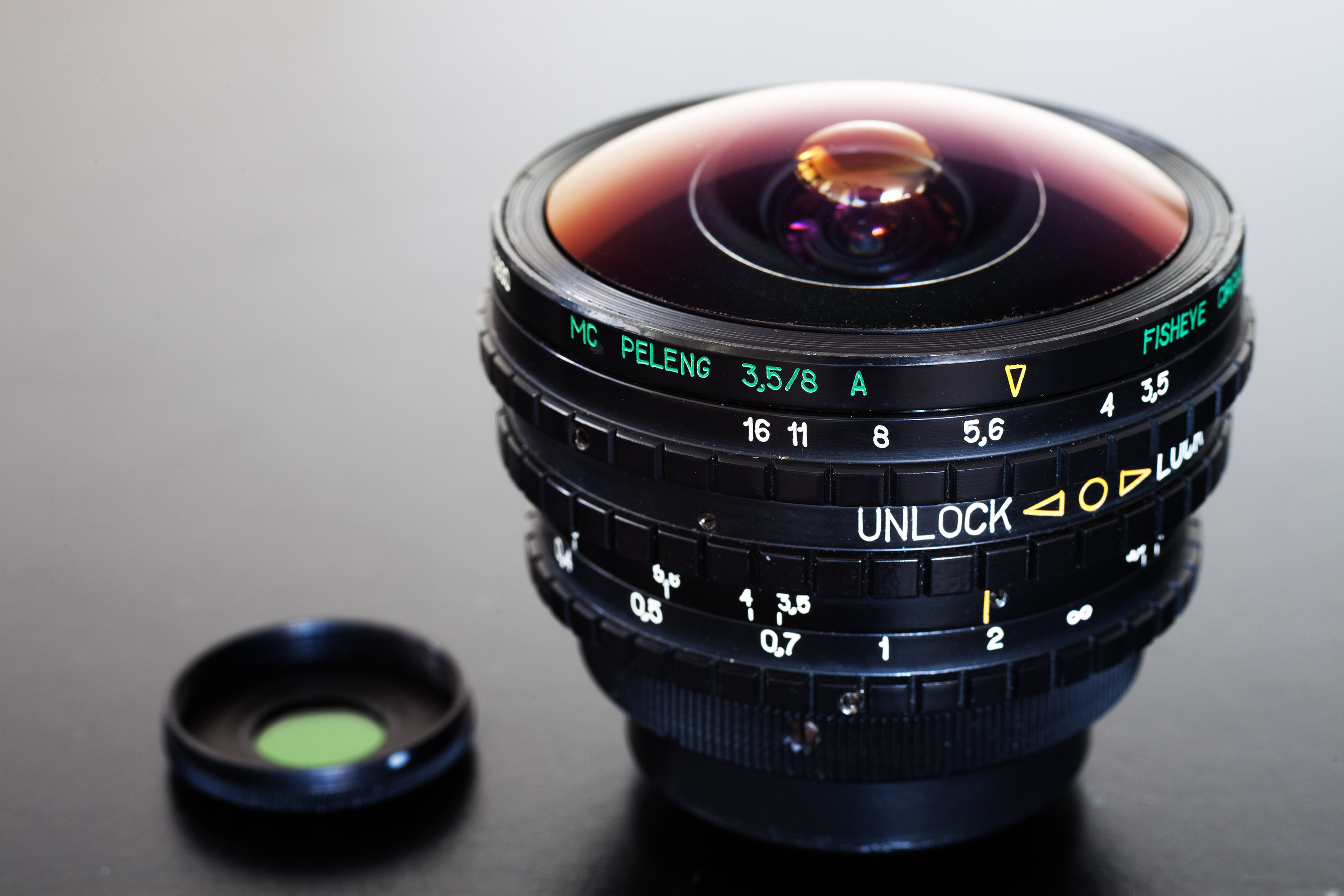
The Peleng 8 mm f/3.5 circular fisheye lens

- Accura 12 mm f/8 (180° portrait fisheye lens, i.e. optimised for the height rather than the width of the frame, thus giving a circular image of larger diameter, i.e. cropped at the top and bottom. 1968. Sold as Beroflex, Berolina, Panomar, Sigma, Spiratone, Universa, Upsilon, Vemar etc. Very bad.)
- C-4 Optics Hyperfisheye 4.9 mm f/3.5 (270°, 2020, for mirrorless camera only, 13 kg)
- Canon FD 7.5 mm f/5.6 (180°, 1971, three versions: initial version with silver bayonet ring, 1973 S.S.C. version with silver bayonet ring, 1979 NewFD version with the same SSC coating, black bayonet ring; all have inbuilt, wheel-selectable colour filters)
- Entaniya HAL 200 6 mm f/4 (200°, 19.9 mm image diameter, for mirrorless camera only)
- Entaniya HAL 250 6 mm f/5.6 (250°, 23.7 mm image diameter, for mirrorless camera only, fixed aperture, 2 kg (the company also makes a 280° model with however only 5mm image diameter))
- Nikon F 6 mm f/2.8 (220°, 1972)
- Nikon F 6 mm f/5.6 (220°, 1970)
- Nikon F 6.2 mm f/5.6 (230° and at its time the widest fisheye. The barrel looks like the aforementioned 6 mm f/5.6, but with different engraving: 6.2 mm 230°. Reportedly the rarest Nikon lens in existence, only 3 produced)
- Nikon F 7.5 mm f/5.6 (220°, 1966)
- Nikon F 8 mm f/2.8 (180°, 1970)
- Nikon F 8 mm f/8 (180°, 1962)
- Olympus OM Auto-Fisheye 8 mm f/2.4 (180°, rare)
- Peleng 8 mm f/3.5 (180°)
- Sigma 8 mm f/4.0 EX DG (180°)
- Sigma 8 mm f/3.5 EX DG (180°, successor to the Sigma 8 mm f/4.0)
- Weapons Research Establishment (now defunct) of Salisbury, South Australia, made a 186° fisheye lens with an image diameter of about 25mm and an optical design, now by R. Dixon, very close to the original Beck Hill design.

==== Full-frame (i.e. diagonal) fisheye lenses ====
- Canon EF 15 mm f/2.8 (optically simpler successor of the below FD model; since discontinued)
- Canon Fisheye FD 15 mm f/2.8 (predecessor of the above, incompatible with EF mount. Two versions: original with silver bayonet ring, 1973; NewFD with black bayonet ring, 1980. Both have inbuilt colour filters and S.S.C. coating)
- Fuji Photo Film Co. EBC Fujinon Fish Eye 16 mm f/2.8 (M42 and X-Fujinon mounts, discontinued)
- Minolta AF 16 mm f/2.8, since continued as Sony A
- Nikon Fisheye-Nikkor 16 mm f/2.8 AI-s and AF D (since 1979)
- Nikon Fisheye-Nikkor 16 mm f/3.5 (1973, predecessor of the above)
- Pentax SMC 17 mm f/4 Fish-Eye
- Pentax 18 mm f/11 Pancake Fisheye (160°)
- Samyang 12 mm f/2.8 ED AS NCS Diagonal Fisheye (famous for its stereographic projection; available in several SLR and mirrorless camera mounts)
- Sigma 15 mm f/2.8 EX DG Diagonal Fisheye
- TTArtisan 11mm f/2.8 Fisheye (notable as the first fisheye lens marketed, among others, in Leica M rangefinder mount and for Fuji GFX (the lens does not cover the full GFX frame, though!). An expert found it is actually 15 mm in focal length and has an angle of view of only 176°.)
- Zenitar 16 mm f/2.8 Fisheye lens

==== Zoom fisheye lenses ====
- Canon EF 8–15 mm f/4L Fisheye USM – 180° at all focal lengths, but turning from a circular to a diagonal fisheye on a 35 mm full-frame camera, i.e. changing in vertical angle of view. On a crop camera with APS-C/H size sensors, it only yields a cropped circular and full-frame image. A zoom lock is included which avoids leaving the focal length range of full coverage on crop sensor cameras.
- Nikon AF-S Fisheye Nikkor 8–15 mm f/3.5–4.5E ED – designed for full-frame and FX cameras, this lens behaves identically to the Canon.
- Tokina AT-X AF DX = Pentax DA ED IF 10–17 mm f/3.4–4.5 – a fisheye zoom lens designed for APS-C sensor cameras, also sold as an NH version without integrated lens hood: then, it is usable on full frame cameras.
- Pentax F 17–28 mm f/3.5–4.5 Fisheye – This lens was born for 35 mm full frame film cameras, to take the place of the 16 mm f/2.8 in the AF era. It starts from a 17 mm full-frame (diagonal) fisheye. When it reaches 28 mm, the fisheye effect is almost gone, leaving an overdistorted wideangle image. It was intended as a "special effect" lens and is claimed not to have sold too many copies.

==== Curiosities ====
- Canon 5.2 mm f/2.8 RF L (a 190° stereographic fisheye with two fisheye lens systems: for 3D virtual reality shooting onto a single 35 mm full-frame image sensor, and less relevant for photography: fitting two image circles onto one frame of 36 mm width means that each can only be 18 mm in diameter, wasting quite a bit of resolution)
- Pentax K "Bird's eye" 8.4 mm f/2.8 (prototype, 1982, rendition not quite the same as a fisheye)

== Sample images ==
An image of the Louvre museum entry taken with the 7.5 mm f/5.6 circular fisheye Nikkor lens

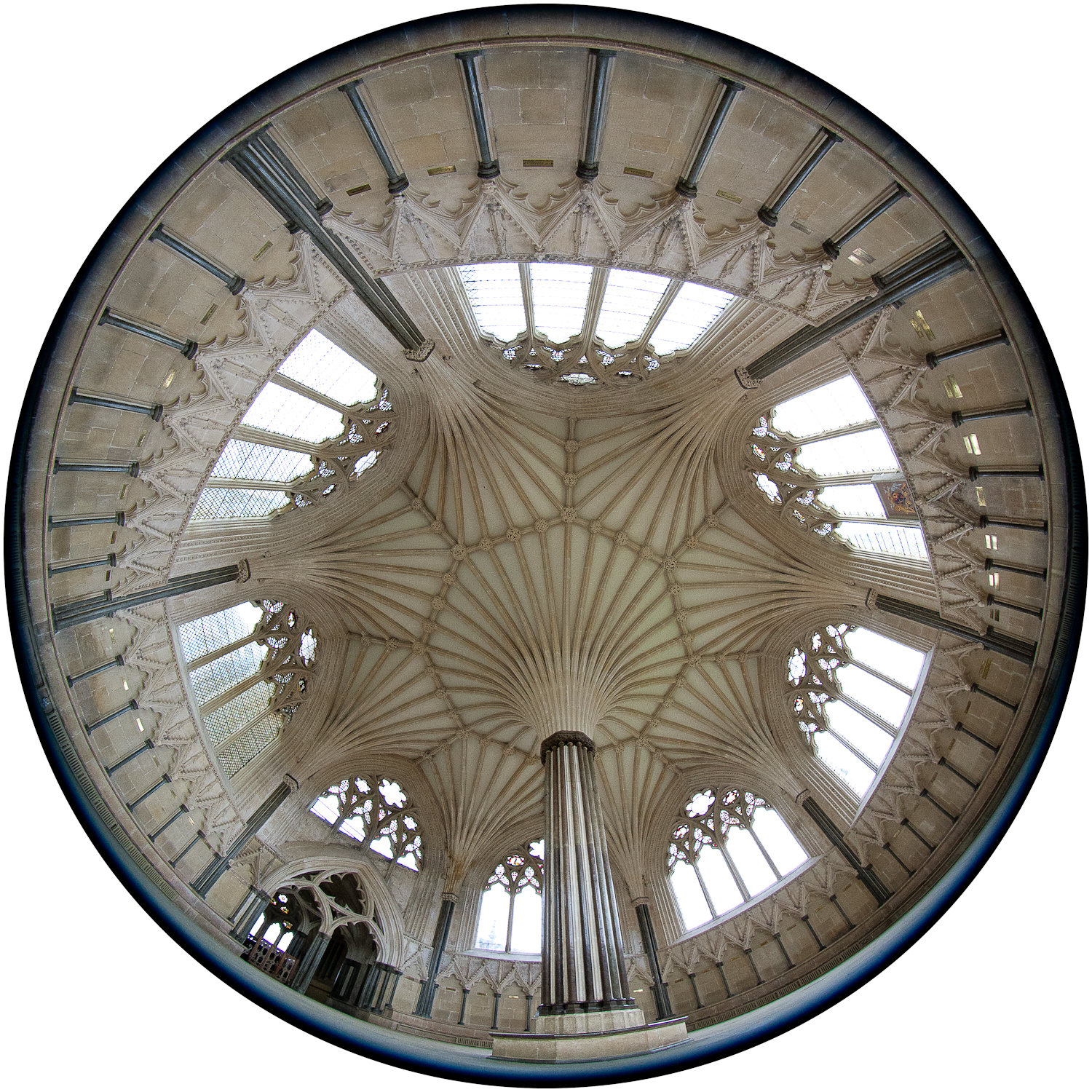
Fisheye used to capture entire Wells Cathedral Chapter House room

Canon 8–15 mm zoom at 8 mm of BMW M3

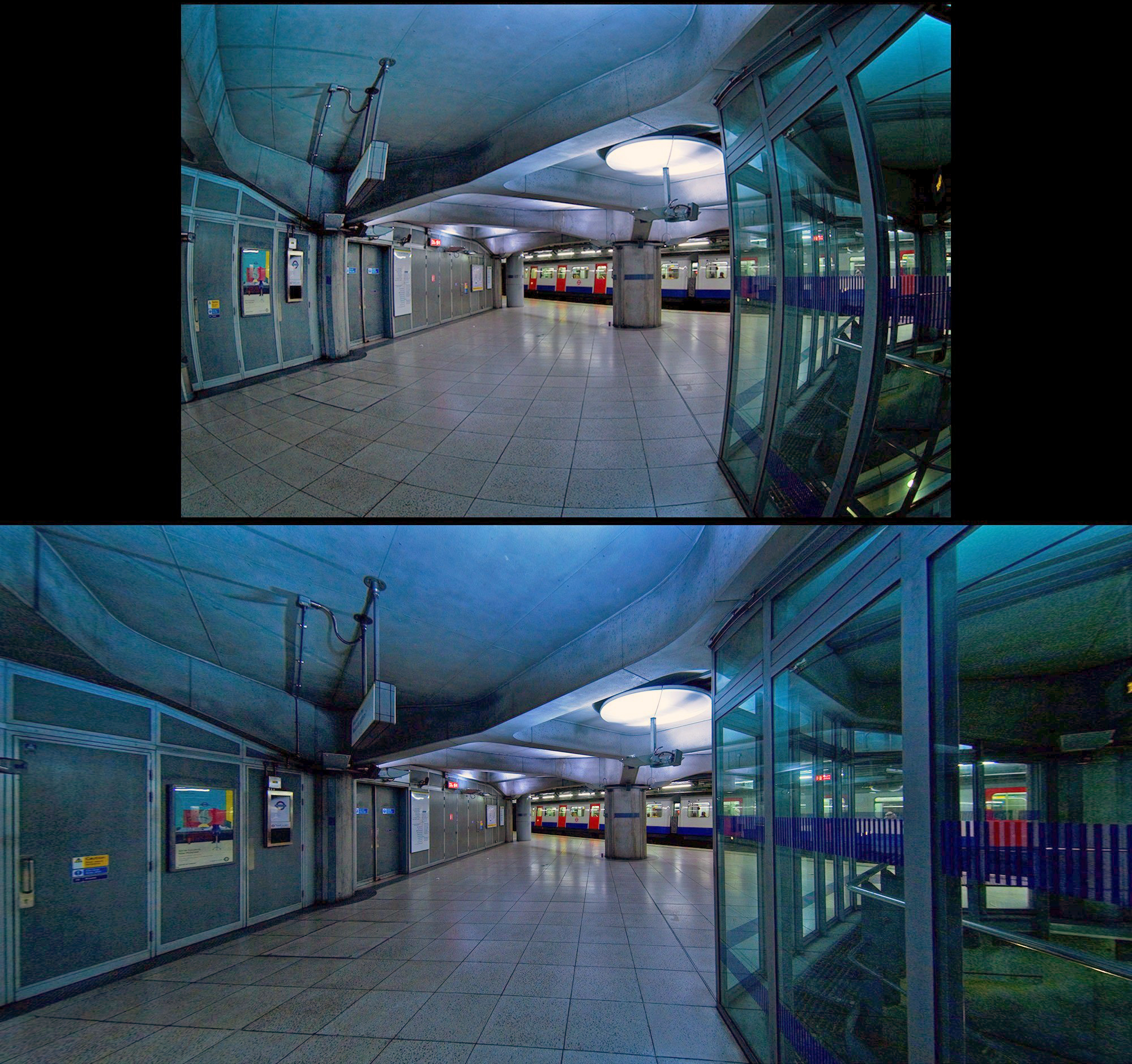
Image shot with a 16 mm full-frame fisheye lens before and after remapping to rectilinear perspective. (Note: Camera: a 35 mm format digital SLR, editing tool: Panorama Tools)

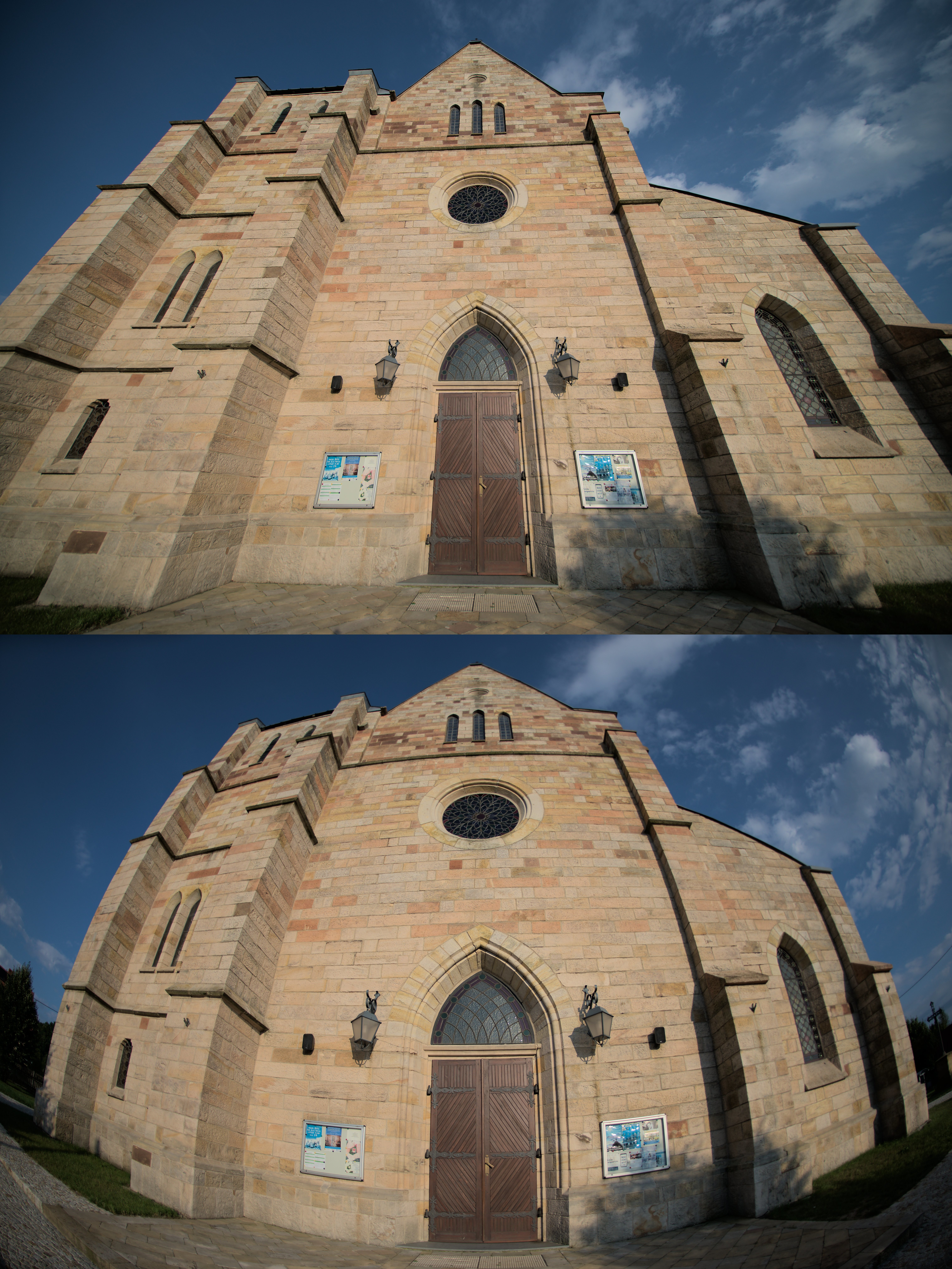
Comparison of rectilinear 11mm lens and fisheye 16mm lens on a full frame DSLR

Comparison of conventional (rectilinear) mapping function with four different fisheye mapping functions, given a constant focal length.

== Other applications ==
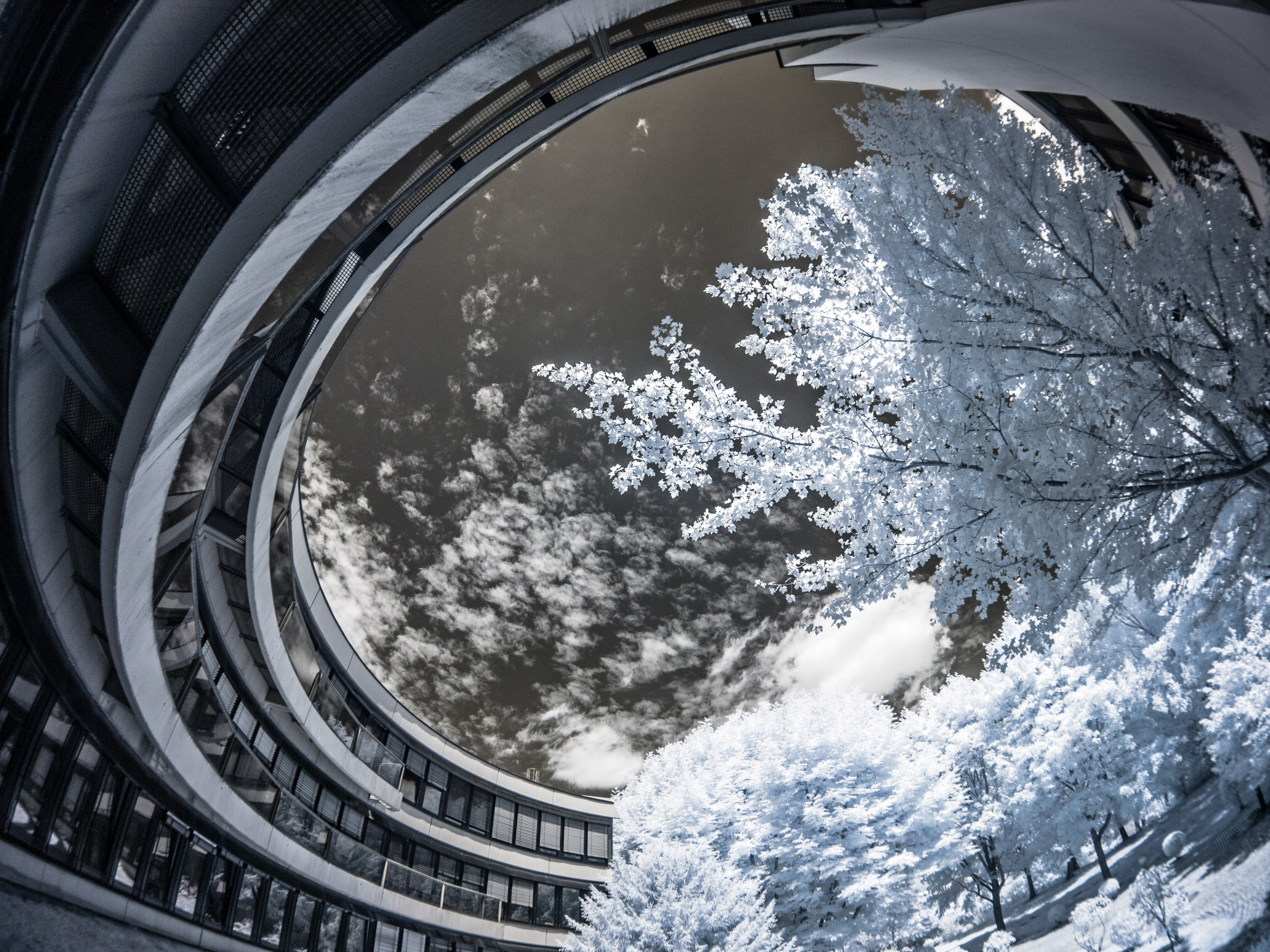
The curves of ESO's headquarters through a fish-eye lens.

- Many planetariums now use fisheye projection lenses to project the night sky or other digital content onto the interior of a dome.
- Fish-eye lenses are used in POV pornography to make things right in front of the camera look bigger.
- Flight simulators and visual combat simulators use fisheye projection lenses in order to create an immersive environment for pilots, air traffic controllers, or military personnel to train in.
- Similarly, the IMAX Dome (previously 'OMNIMAX') motion-picture format involves photography through a circular fisheye lens, and projection through the same onto a hemispherical screen.
- Scientists and resource managers (e.g., biologists, foresters, and meteorologists) use fisheye lenses for hemispherical photography to calculate plant canopy indices and near-ground solar radiation. Applications include evaluation of forest health, characterization of monarch butterfly winter roosting sites, and management of vineyards.
- Astronomers use fisheye lenses to capture cloud cover and light pollution data.
- Photographers and videographers use fisheye lenses so they can get the camera as close as possible for action shots whilst also capturing context, for example in skateboarding to focus on the board and still retain an image of the skater.
- The "eye" of the HAL 9000 computer from 2001: A Space Odyssey was constructed using a Fisheye-Nikkor 8 mm f/8 lens. HAL's point-of-view was filmed using a Fairchild-Curtis 'bug-eye' lens originally designed for films in the Cinerama 360 dome format.
- The first music video to be shot near completely with fisheye lens was for the Beastie Boys song "Hold It Now, Hit It" in 1987.
- In Computer Graphics, circular fisheye images can be used to create environment maps from the physical world. One complete 180-degree wide angle fisheye image will fit to half of cubic mapping space using the proper algorithm. Environment maps can be used to render 3D objects and virtual panoramic scenes.
- Many personal weather station online cameras around the world upload fisheye images of the current local sky conditions as well as a previous day time-lapse sequence with climate conditions such as temperature, humidity, wind and rainfall amounts.
- In door's peepholes, to allow the viewer inside to see a wider view from the outside.

== Mapping function ==
The subject is placed in the image by the lens according to the mapping function of the lens. The mapping function gives r, the position of the object from the center of the image, as a function of f, the focal length, and θ, the angle from the optical axis, in radians.

Comparison of mapping functions
| Subject | Original tunnel to be photographed, with camera looking from inside center to left wall. | | | | |
| | Normal | Fisheye | | | |
| | Rectilinear | Stereographic | Equidistant | Equisolid angle | Orthographic |
| Other names | gnomonic, perspective, conventional | panoramic, conform, planisphere | linear, linear-scaled | equal-area | orthogonal |
| Image | | | | | |
| Mapping function | $r = f \tan \theta$ | $r = 2 f \tan \frac \theta 2$ | $r = f \, \theta$ | $r = 2 f \sin \frac \theta 2$ (Note: Special case of r = k_{1} f sin θ/k_{2}, where k_{1} = k_{2} =2. Some fisheyes, such as the AF Nikkor DX 10.5 mm f/2.8 have slightly different values for k_{1} and k_{2}.) | $r = f \sin \theta$ |
| Notes | Works like the pinhole camera. Straight lines remain straight (distortion free). $\theta$ has to be smaller than 90°. The aperture angle is gaged symmetrically to the optical axis and has to be smaller than 180°. Large aperture angles are difficult to design and lead to high prices. | Maintains angles. This mapping would be ideal for photographers because it doesn't compress marginal objects as much. Samyang is the only manufacturer to produce this kind of fisheye lens, but it is available under different brand names. This mapping is easily implemented by software. | Maintains angular distances. Practical for angle measurement (e.g., star maps). PanoTools uses this type of mapping. | Maintains surface relations. Every pixel subtends an equal solid angle, or an equal area on the unit sphere. Looks like a mirror image on a ball, best special effect (unsophisticated distances), suitable for area comparison (clouds grade determination). This type is popular but it compresses marginal objects. The prices of these lenses are high, but not extreme. | Maintains planar illuminance. Looks like an orb with the surroundings lying on < max. 180° aperture angle. Highly distorted near the edge of the image, but image in center is less compressed. |
| Examples | (Numerous) | Samyang 8 mm f/2.8; Samyang 12 mm f/2.8 | Canon FD 7.5 mm f/5.6; Coastal Optical 7.45 mm f/5.6; Nikkor 6 mm f/2.8; Nikkor 7.5 mm f/5.6; Nikkor 8 mm f/2.8; Nikkor 8 mm f/8.0; Peleng 8 mm f/3.5; Rokkor 7.5 mm f/4.0; Sigma 8 mm f/3.5; Samyang 7.5 mm f/3.5 | Canon EF 15 mm f/2.8 (1988); Minolta 16 mm f/2.8 (1971); Nikkor 10.5 mm f/2.8 (Note: For this lens, k_{1} = 1.47 and 1/k_{2} = 0.713, determined empirically.); Nikkor 16 mm f/2.8 (1995); Sigma 4.5 mm f/2.8; Sigma 8 mm f/3.5 EX DG; Sigma 8 mm f/4.0 (Note: In this case, k_{1} = 1.88 and 1/k_{2} = 0.54.); Sigma 15 mm f/2.8 (1990); Zuiko 8 mm f/2.8 | Nikkor 10 mm f/5.6 OP; Yasuhara Madoka180 7.3 mm f/4 |

Other mapping functions (for example Panomorph Lenses) are also possible for enhancing the off-axis resolution of fisheye lenses.

With appropriate software, the curvilinear images produced by a fisheye lens can be remapped to a conventional rectilinear projection. Although this entails some loss of detail at the edges of the frame, the technique can produce an image with a field of view greater than that of a conventional rectilinear lens. This is particularly useful for creating panoramic images.

All types of fisheye lenses bend straight lines. Aperture angles of 180° or more are possible only with large amounts of barrel distortion.

== See also ==
- Azimuthal equidistant projection
- Curvilinear perspective
- Dashcam
- Miniature faking
- Stereographic projection
