= Whole sky camera =

Specialized camera in meteorology and astronomy

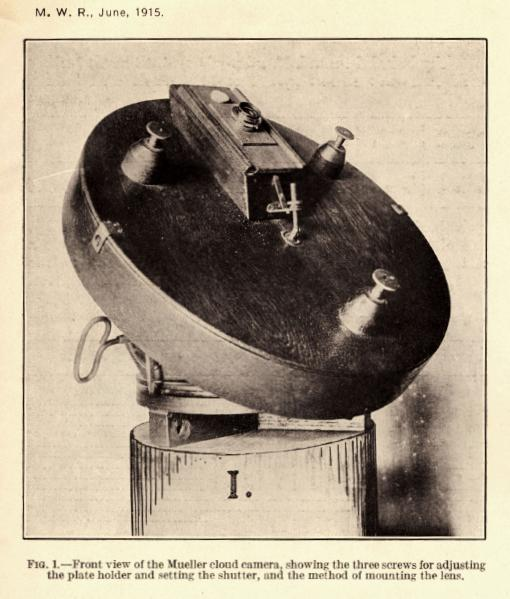
Mueller whole sky camera (ca. 1905) modified by Fassig. Reported in the 1915 issue of Monthly Weather Review

A whole sky camera is a specialized camera used in meteorology and astronomy for capturing a photograph of the entire sky. Another application is that of hemispherical photography to study plant canopy geometry and to calculate near-ground solar radiation.

== Development ==
Whole sky cameras typically use a fisheye lens that takes in an extremely wide, hemispherical image. Such lenses were originally developed for use in meteorology.

However, alternative techniques are based on the photography of a mirror-like hemisphere which are more common. One of the first reported whole sky cameras was based on a series of pictures with lenses inclined to the horizon at an altitude of 45 degrees. With a lens that covers an angular field of 90 degrees, such camera revolves about a vertical axis.

== Meteorological applications ==
In meteorological applications, whole sky cameras are used to study cloud cover, the current level of UV radiation, fractional cloud coverage, sky polarization, the computation of cloud base height and wind speed at cloud heights. Other uses include creating time-lapse photography of clouds. Whole sky cameras may be equipped with a sun tracking device to block sunlight which is too bright for the typical dynamic range of photographs. Sun tracking allows for reliable estimates of cloud fractional coverage, including cover in the part of the sky close to the Sun. There are techniques such as HDR which permit the taking of high dynamic range photographs without a sun tracker.

== Astronomical applications ==
Whole sky camera also popularly known as an all-sky camera in the astronomical field is used for meteor, fireball, and spacecraft reentry recording and identification. While mostly identical to the meteorological application, the system for astronomical use tends to have a more sensitive night camera and much longer exposure due to the night-use nature of the camera.

== Cloud stereoscopy ==
Whole sky cameras in stereo configurations can be used to derive cloud base height and cloud base motion. The first work on this application of photogrammetry was done in 1896.

== Images ==
Examples of modern whole sky cameras
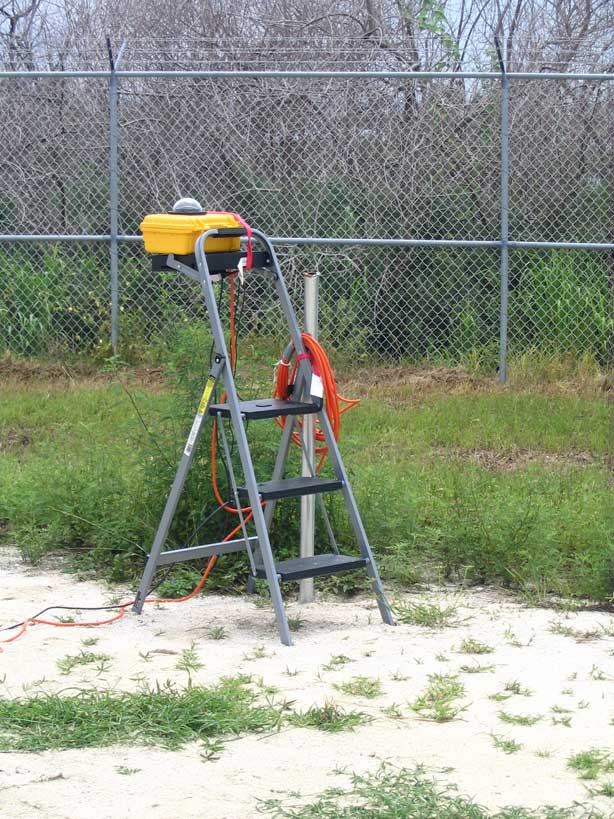
Simple whole sky camera based on Canon A75 located north of Kennedy Space Center during meteorological experiment close to the MCR radar

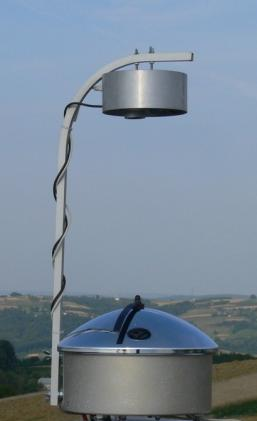
Whole sky camera based on reflecting (mirror) dome with sun tracker. Constructed by K. Markowicz

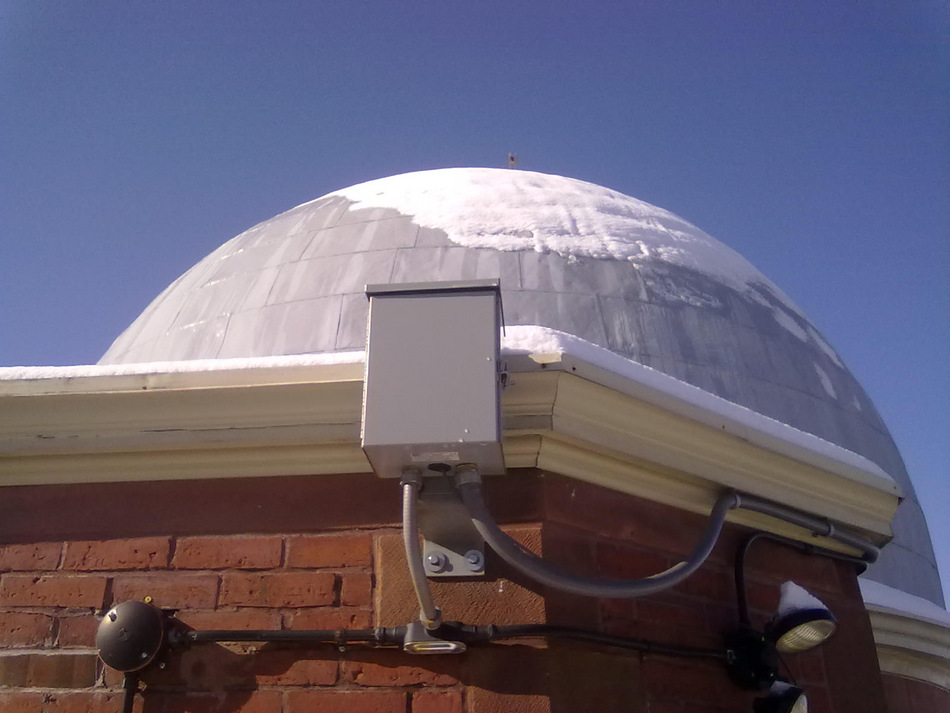
Night sky camera mounted on the roof of an observatory

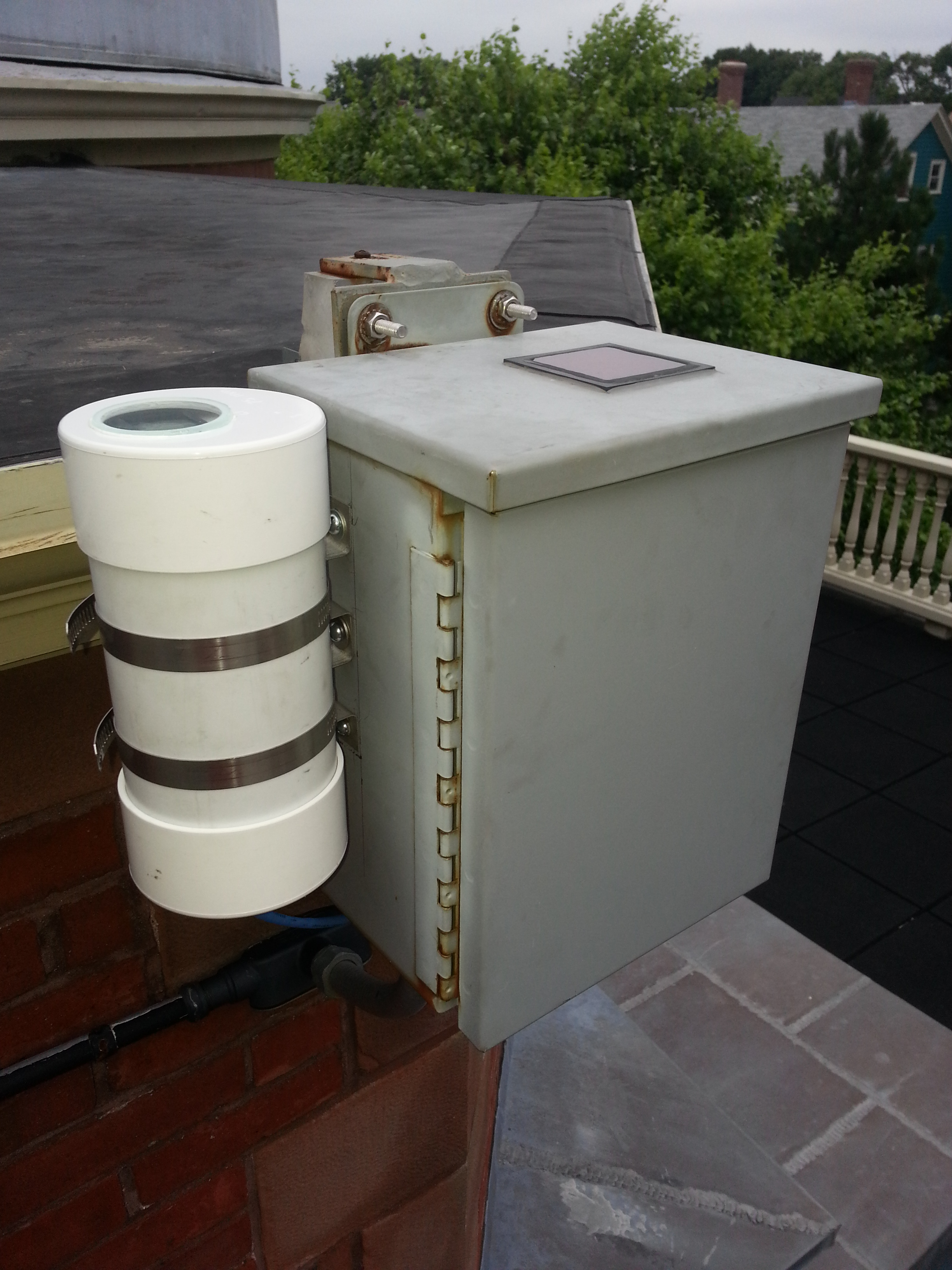
Closeup of the weatherproof box housing a whole sky camera
Examples of whole sky images
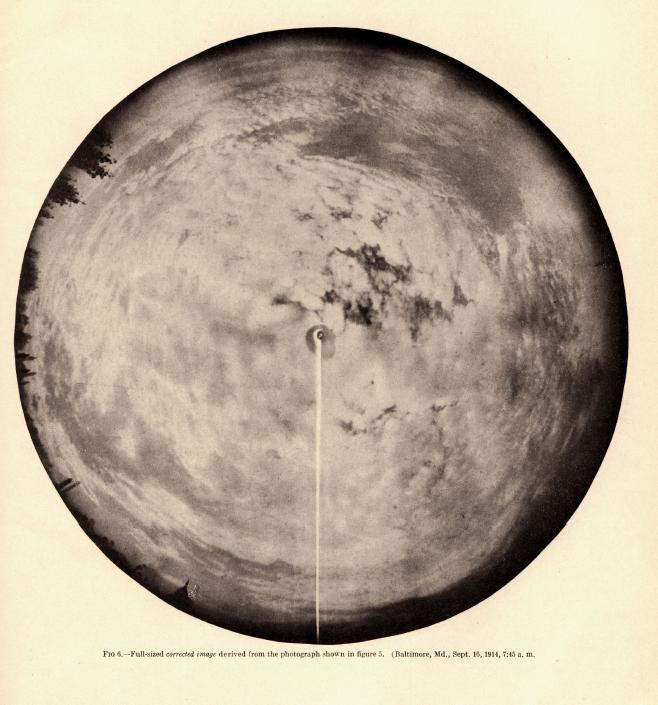
Baltimore, Md., Sept. 16, 1914, 7:45am. Taken from Mueller's inclined camera.

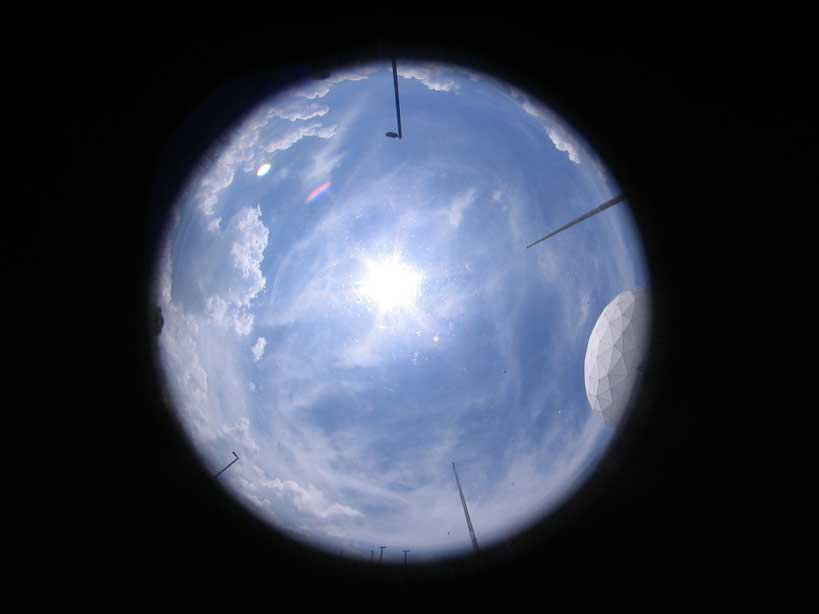
N. Of Kennedy Space Center, Fl. on July 24, 2009. Taken from Flatau's camera.

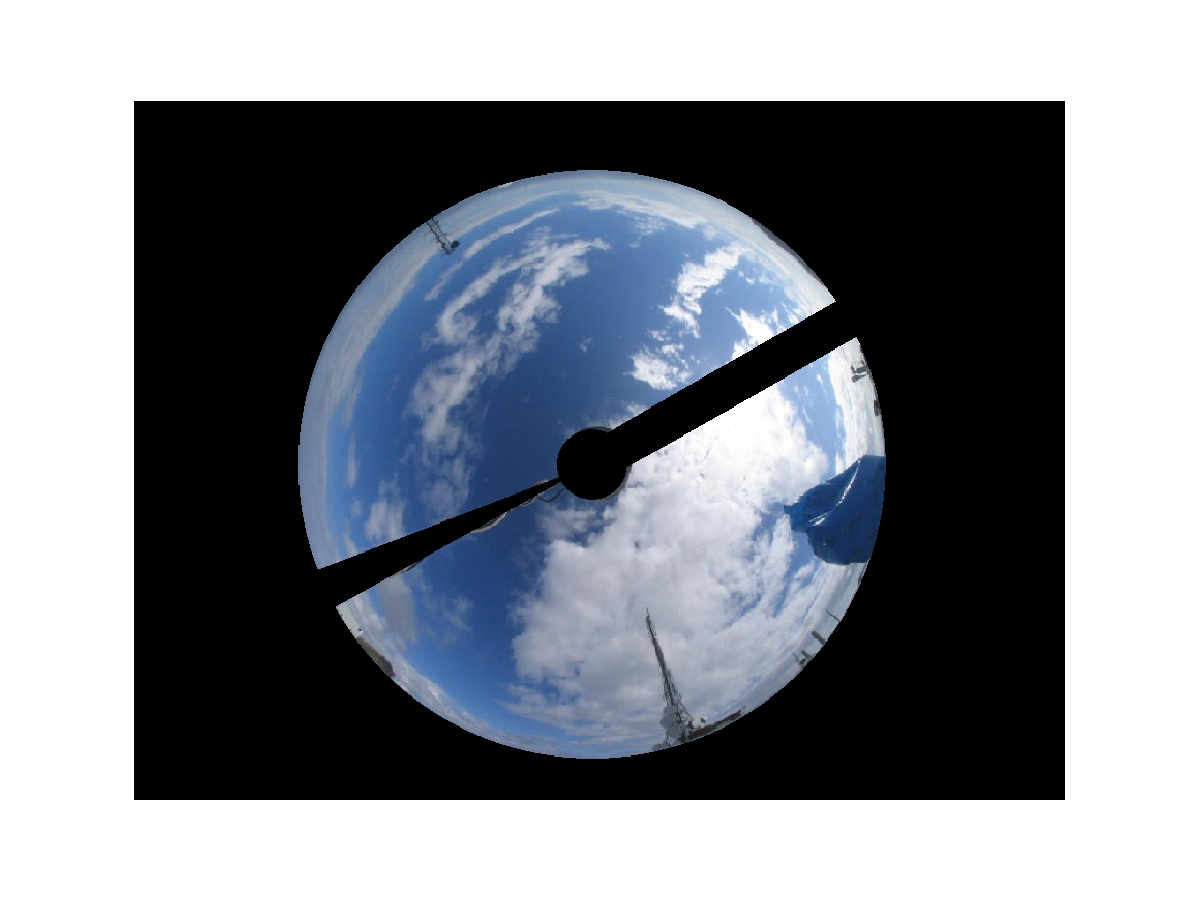
Sky image based on K. Markowicz's design. Black stripe covering the sun (sun tracker) is visible.

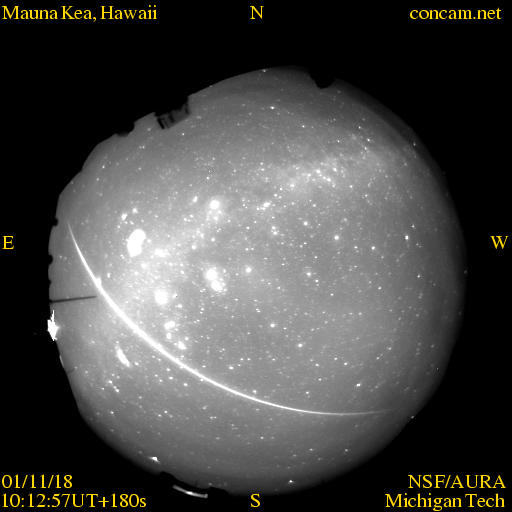
Sky image from the CONCAM at Mauna Kea Observatories on Nov. 18, 2001, showing the long trail of a Leonid meteor

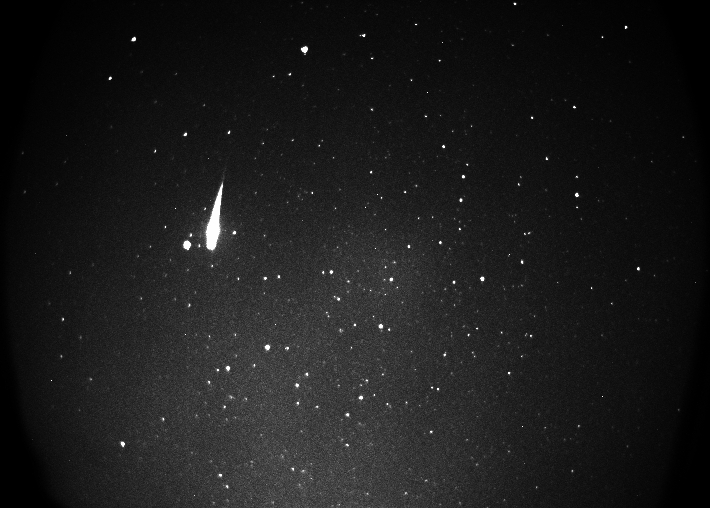
Sky image from Ladd Observatory on January 19, 2012, showing the flash of a bright fireball
