= List of omnidirectional (360-degree) cameras =

Omnidirectional (360-degree cameras) can capture spherical 360°$\times$180° panoramic photos or videos.

All-in-one omnidirectional cameras
Brand	Model	Release year	Camera design	Lens #	Photo resolution	Video support	Video specification	Size(WHD,mm)	Weight(g)	Remark
Panono	Panono	2011	36 lens separated	36	16384 x 8192	No	N/A	Φ110	480	Raw camera data is processed by Panono cloud to generate 360 image.
Panox	Panox V2	2024	Symmetrical dual-fisheye lens	2	11968 x 5984	Yes	7680×3840@30fps	134 x 50 x 20	200	Google Street View support, Ethernet, ON-device GPS
Vuze	Vuze	2017	4 pairs of fisheye lenses	8	4K per eye	Yes	4K@30fps	120x120x30mm	450	IP64
Vuze+	Vuze+	2017	4 pairs of fisheye lenses	8	4K per eye	Yes	4K@30fps for 3D or 4K@60fps for 2D	120x120x30mm	460	IP65
BUBL	Bublcam	2013	4 lens in tetrahedron	4	14Mp	Yes	1984×992@30fps	Φ80	280	Did not deliver to Kickstarter backers, out of business
Ricoh	Ricoh Theta	2013	Symmetrical dual-fisheye lens	2	?	No	N/A	42mm×129×22.8 (17.4)	95	First dual lens panorama camera design
Ricoh	Ricoh Theta m15	2014	Symmetrical dual-fisheye lens	2	?	Yes	1920×1080@15fps	42×129×22.8 (17.4)	95	
Ricoh	Ricoh Theta S	2015	Symmetrical dual-fisheye lens	2	5376×2688	Yes	1920×1080@30fps	44×130×22.9 (17.9)	125	On-device HDR
Ricoh	Ricoh Theta SC	2016	Symmetrical dual-fisheye lens	2	5376×2688	Yes	1920×1080@30fps	45.2×130.6×22.9 (17.9)	102	On-device HDR
Ricoh	Ricoh Theta SC2	2019	Symmetrical dual-fisheye lens	2	5376×2688	Yes	3840×1920@30fps	45.2×130.6×22.9 (17.9)	121	On-device HDR
Ricoh	Ricoh Theta V	2017	Symmetrical dual-fisheye lens	2	5376×2688	Yes	3840×1920@30fps	45.2×130.6×22.9 (17.9)	121	On-device HDR
Ricoh	Ricoh Theta Z1	2019	Symmetrical dual-fisheye lens	2	6720x3360	Yes	3840×1920@30fps	48 x 132.5 x 29.7	182	1.0-inch back illuminated CMOS image sensor, On-device HDR
Ricoh	Ricoh Theta X	2022	Symmetrical dual-fisheye lens	2	11008 x 5504	Yes	5760 x 2880@30fps 8k@10fps	51.7 × 136.2 × 29.0	170	Removable/Rechargeable battery DB-110, On-device GPS, microSDXC Memory Card
Insta360	Insta360 4K	2015	Parallel dual-fisheye lens	2	12Mp	Yes	4096×2048@25fps	74.5×158×48	?	
Insta360	Insta360 Nano	2016	Parallel dual-fisheye lens	2	3040×1520	Yes	???	33×110×21	70±5	With Lightning, can be used independently
Insta360	Insta360 Air	2017	Symmetrical dual-fisheye lens	2	3008×1504	Yes	2560×1280@30fps	Φ37.6	26.5	need Android device, can't be used independently
Insta360	Insta360 One	2020	Parallel dual-fisheye lens	2	6912×3456	Yes	3840×1920@30fps 2560×1280@60fps 2048×512@120fps	36.5×96×35.34	130g	use bullet time as selling proposition, achieved by high-fps and software tracking (need app support).
Insta360	Insta360 Pro	2017	6 fisheye lens horizontally	6	7680×3840	Yes	Post-production 7680×3840@30fps camera processing 3840×1920@30fps	Φ143	1228	Professional Model
Insta360	Insta360 Pro2	2018	6 fisheye lens horizontally	6	7680×3840	Yes	Post-production 7680×7680@30fps (3D) camera processing 7680x3840@30fps (2D); 7680 x 3840 @5 fps (Google Street View)	Φ143	1550	Professional Model
Insta360	Insta360 One X	2018	Symmetrical dual-fisheye lens	2	6080 x 3040	Yes	5760 x 2880 at 30 fps	48 x 115 x 28	115	
Insta360	Insta360 One R	2018	Symmetrical dual-fisheye lens	2	6080 x 3040	Yes	5760 x 2880 at 30 fps	72mm x 48mm x 43mm	130g	Modular system
Insta360	Insta360 X3	2022	Symmetrical dual-fisheye lens	2	72Mpx: 11968x5984 18Mpx: 5952x2976	Yes	360: 5,7K: 5760x2880 @ 30/25/24 Fps 4K: 3840x1920 @ 60/30 Fps Single-lens Mode: 4K: 3840x2160 @ 30/25/24 Fps 3,6 K: 3584x2016 @ 60/50/30/25/24 Fps 2.7K: 2720x1530 @ 60/50/30/25/24 Fps 1080p: 1920x1088 @ 60/50/30/25/24 Fps	11,4 x 45 x 33mm	178,602	
Insta360	X4	2024	Symmetrical dual-fisheye lens	2	72Mpx: 11968x5984 18Mpx: 5952x2976	Yes	360º Mode: 8K: 7680x3840@30/25/24fps, 5.7K+: 5760x2880@30/25/24fps, 5.7K: 5760x2880@60/50/30/25/24fps 4K: 3840x1920@100/60/50/30/25/24fps	46 x 123.6 x 37.6 mm	203	Optional lens protectors. Replaceable battery, memory-card. Run time at 8K30fps is 75 minutes.
Insta360	X5	2025	Symmetrical dual-fisheye lens	2	72Mpx: 11904 × 5952 18Mpx:5888 × 2944	Yes	360: 8K: 7680×3840@30/25/24fps, 5.7K+: 5760x2880@30/25/24fps, 5.7K: 5760x2880@60/50/48/30/25/24fps, 4K: 3840x1920@120/100/60/50/48/30/25/24fps	46 × 124.5 × 38.2 mm	200	Replaceable lenses, battery, memory-card. Run-time for 8K30fps recoding: 93 mins.
Insta360	X6	2026	Symmetrical dual-fisheye lens	2	15520 × 7760	Yes	7680 × 3840 @ 50fps	50 × 100 × 40 mm	196	Replaceable lenses, 2600 mAh battery, memory-card, 1/1.1" quadratic sensors, 14.5 EVs dynamic range. Run-time for 8K30fps recoding: 140 mins.
Insta360	Titan	2019	8 fisheye lens horizontally	8	10560x5280 (55Mpx)	Yes	10560 x 5280 @30fps (11K 2D) 9600 x 9600 @30fps (10K 3D)	Φ228	5.5	
Samsung	Samsung Gear360	2016	Symmetrical dual-fisheye lens	2	25.9Mp	Yes	3840×1920@30fps	66.7×56.3×60.1	152	Discontinued
Samsung	Samsung Gear360	2017	Symmetrical dual-fisheye lens	2	5472×2736(15Mp)	Yes	4096×2048@24fps	46.3×100.6×45.1	130	Same name, usually called "2017 ver."
LG	LG 360 CAM	2016	Symmetrical dual-fisheye lens	2	5660×2830(16Mp)	Yes	2k@?fps	39.9×97.1×24.9	75	Discontinued
MadV	Madventure 360	2017	Symmetrical dual-fisheye lens	2	6912×3456	Yes	3456×1728@30fps 2304×1152@60fps	78×67.4×24	108.3	
Nikon	Nikon Keymission 360	2016	Symmetrical dual-fisheye lens	2	7744×3872(30Mp)	Yes	2160p@24fps	65.7×60.6×61.1	198	Water proof / action camera
Xiaomi	米家全景相机	2017	Symmetrical dual-fisheye lens	2	6912×3456	Yes	3456×1728@30fps 2304×1152@60fps	78×67.4×24	108.3	小米 cooperated with 疯景, using Ambarella A12 solution
小蚁(YI)	小蚁VR全景相机	2017	Symmetrical dual-fisheye lens	2	5760×2880	Yes	Post-production 5760×2880@30fps 3840×1920@30fps	53.2×102×29.6	180	using AmbarellaH2V95 solution
Giroptic iO	Giroptic iO	2016	Symmetrical dual-fisheye lens	2	3840×1920	Yes	1920×960@30fps	73×35 ??	70	as smartphone accessories, can be used independently. Giroptic ceased operations in March 2018.
Garmin	Garmin Virb 360	2017	Symmetrical dual-fisheye lens	2	15Mp	Yes	Post-production 5.7k@30fps 4k@30fps	59.3×39×69.8	160	Water proof / ActionCam
Nokia	Nokia OZO	2016	8 fisheye lens	8	-	Yes	-	264×170×160	4200	Pro models
Z Cam	Z CAM S1	2016	4 fisheye lens horizontally	4	?	Yes	Post-production 6K@30fps camera processing 3840×2160@30fps	Φ92×142	650+370(cam+battery)	Pro models
Z Cam	Z CAM S1 Pro	2017	4 fisheye lens horizontally	4	?	Yes	Post-production6K@30fps camera processing 2816×2816@30fps	Φ126×170.2	1200+370(cam+battery)	Pro models
Z Cam	Z CAM V1 Pro	2017	8 fisheye lens horizontally	8	?	Yes	Post-production 8K@30fps; Post-production stereo 7K@30fps	Φ199×110(with cap 153)	2930	Pro models DC power supply
Rylo	Rylo	2017	Symmetrical dual-fisheye lens	2	6K	Yes	4K@30fps	37×72.5×42.7	108	ActionCam
GoPro	GoPro Fusion	2017	Parallel dual-fisheye lens	2	5.6K	Yes	5.6K	76×39×25	220	Water proof / ActionCam
GoPro	GoPro Max	2020	Parallel dual-fisheye lens	2	5.7K	Yes	5.6K	64×69×41	160	Water proof / ActionCam
GoPro	GoPro Max2	2025	Parallel dual-fisheye lens	2	8K	Yes	8K	64x70x49	195	Water proof / ActionCam
FXG	SEIZE	2019	16 fisheye lens horizontally	16	16K	Yes	16K@30fps	?	?	Professional grade
FXG	FM360 Duo	2020	Parallel dual-fisheye lens	2	12K	Yes	12K@30fps 8K@60fps	16x15x8cm	?	

== See also ==
- Panorama
- Omnidirectional camera
