= Holobuilder =

Technology company

HoloBuilder, Inc.
- Website type: Construction/virtual reality software
- Available in: English
- Headquarters: San Francisco, California
- Founders: Founding-CEO Mostafa Akbari-Hochberg, CTO Simon Heinen, COO Kristina Tenhaft
- Industry: Construction Technology
- Products: Web-based editor www.holobuilder.com, JobWalk
- Subsidiaries: bitstars
- Website: www.holobuilder.com

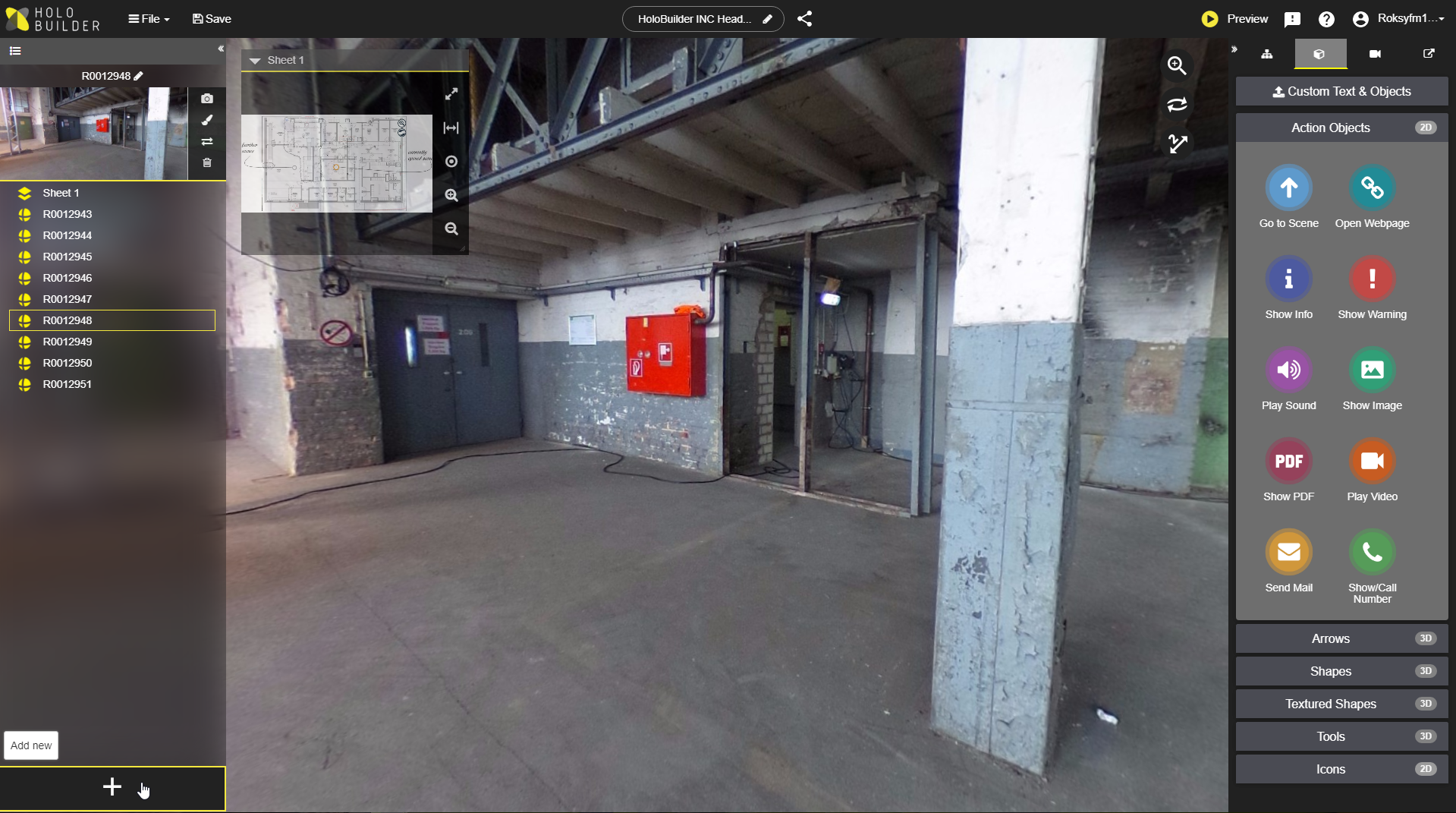
User is capturing the progress on a construction site with a 360° camera

HoloBuilder Inc., founded in 2016 by Mostafa Akbari-Hochberg, Simon Heinen, and Kristina Tenhaft with the goal to assist builders and engineers to create immersive progress views of construction sites.

The company is a German–American construction-technology startup, developed in both San Francisco, California, and Aachen, Germany. They offer tools to create and share 360° views of construction sites and buildings.

Holobuilder was acquired by Faro Technologies in 2021.

== Products ==
=== HoloBuilder ===
Holobuilder.com is an online virtual reality capturing software. This means that users can easily and quickly create virtual tours using 360° photos through your construction site.

HoloBuilder projects support multiple sheets, making it easy to manage big construction sites with multiple floors in one web-based project, which is accessible remotely, coupled with the time-travel feature, another functionality that makes it easy to track the progress over time on a construction site.

Users include construction companies, realtors. architects, designers and Industry 4.0 companies who use it to create Virtual Tours of real estate properties, construction sites or digital Augmented Reality user manuals.

These projects can be created and viewed in the browser and are embeddable into any website as an iFrame. HoloBuilder leverages HTML5 and WebGL to be usable in browsers without the need of plugins such as Adobe Flash, and in mobile browsers. It uses the device sensors to support browser-based VR in Google Cardboard and similar VR headsets.

Users can import their 360 pictures taken with cameras like the Ricoh Theta S and combine them with 3D models from editors like AutoCAD, SketchUp or Blender.

=== JobWalk app ===
The JobWalk App enables users to create virtual 360° tours on the go. The user connects a 360° Camera with his mobile device via Wi-Fi. After taking 360° images and linking the scenes, the 360° tour can be synchronized with the web-platform.

== Product details ==
=== Supported imports ===
- 360° images captured by 360° cameras
- Revit renderings
- Navisworks

=== Features ===
- Collaboration in real-time: allows to invite an unlimited number of collaborators
- TimeTravel: time travel allows to capture progress over time by adding multiple 360° pictures to the same location point on a sheet
- Multiple sheets: Allows to add more than just one sheet, e.g. floorplans, to a single HoloBuilder project
- Add 3D objects
- Add 2D objects
- Face blurring
- Import HoloBuilder projects into a new one
- Share projects
- Embedding HoloBuilder projects as iframe

== Other ==
- Constructech Commercial Top Products 2017
- Gartner Cool Vendor 2016
- Ricoh Theta Grand Prize 2015
