= Rylo =

Rylo, Inc.
- Formerly: Magenta Labs Inc.
- Company type: Private
- Industry: Technology; Videography; Consumer electronics
- Founded: 2015; 11 years ago, Palo Alto, California, United States
- Founders: Alex Karpenko, Chris Cunningham
- Headquarters: San Francisco, California 94107, United States
- Products: Omnidirectional camera
- Website: vsco.com

Rylo, Inc. (marketed as Rylo) was an American technology company founded in 2015. It designed and manufactured an omnidirectional camera and developed a mobile app for editing 360-degree video. In 2019, Rylo was acquired by VSCO, a high-end photo and video editing app with more than 2 million subscribers.

On October 31, 2017, the Rylo 360 camera was announced with previews citing its stabilization and software. On March 2, 2018, the Android version of the Rylo app was released.

On December 10, 2019, Rylo announced the company has been acquired by VSCO.

== See also ==
- List of omnidirectional cameras
