= Kia GT Concept =

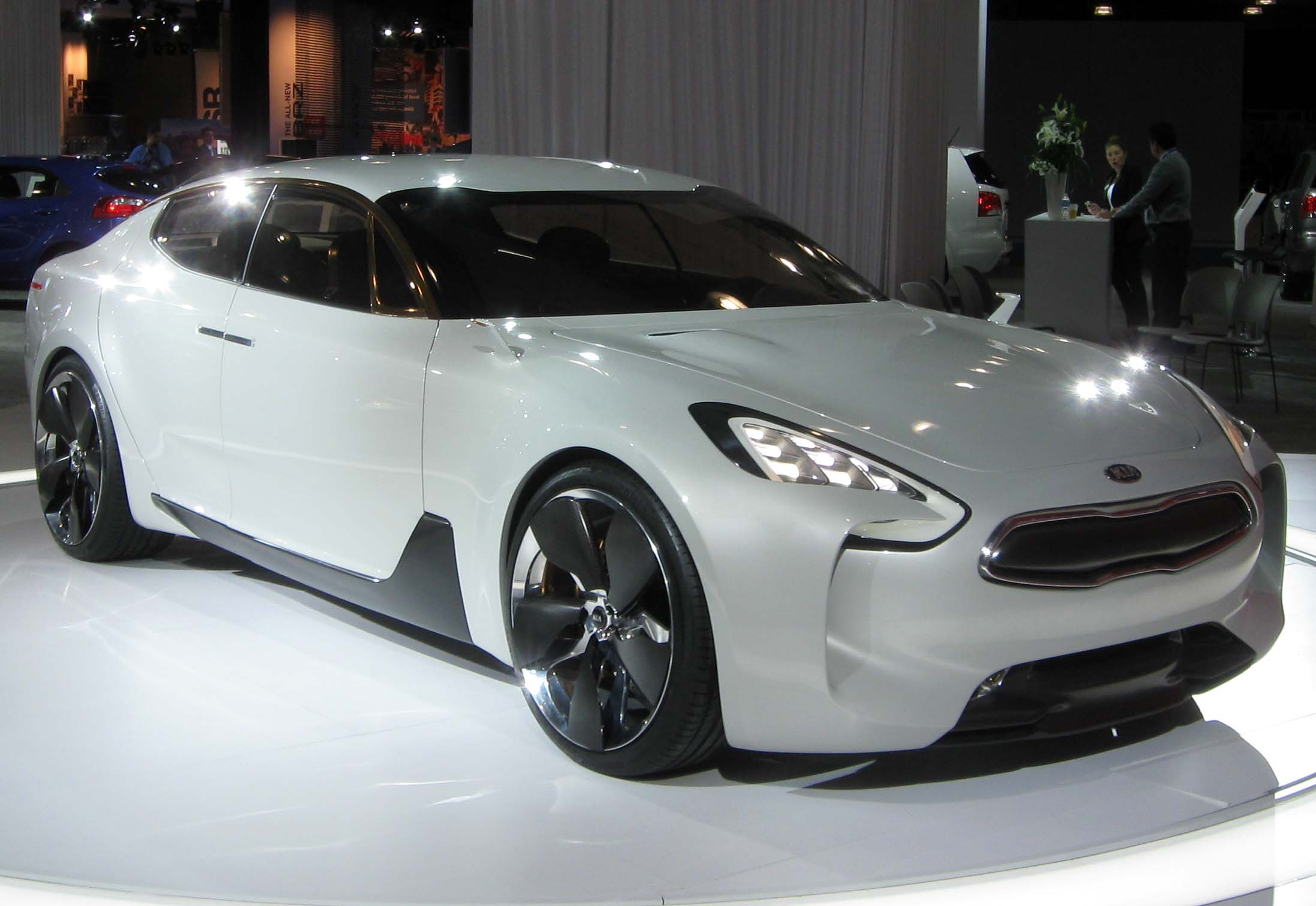

Overview
- Manufacturer: Kia
- Production: 2011
- Designer: Peter Schreyer

Body and chassis
- Class: Concept car
- Body style: 4-door sedan
- Layout: Front-engine, rear-wheel-drive
- Related: Kia K9; Kia Stinger

Powertrain
- Engine: 3.3 L turbocharged V6
- Transmission: 6-speed automatic

The Kia GT Concept is a concept car manufactured by Kia Motors. The car was revealed in 2011.

== Description ==
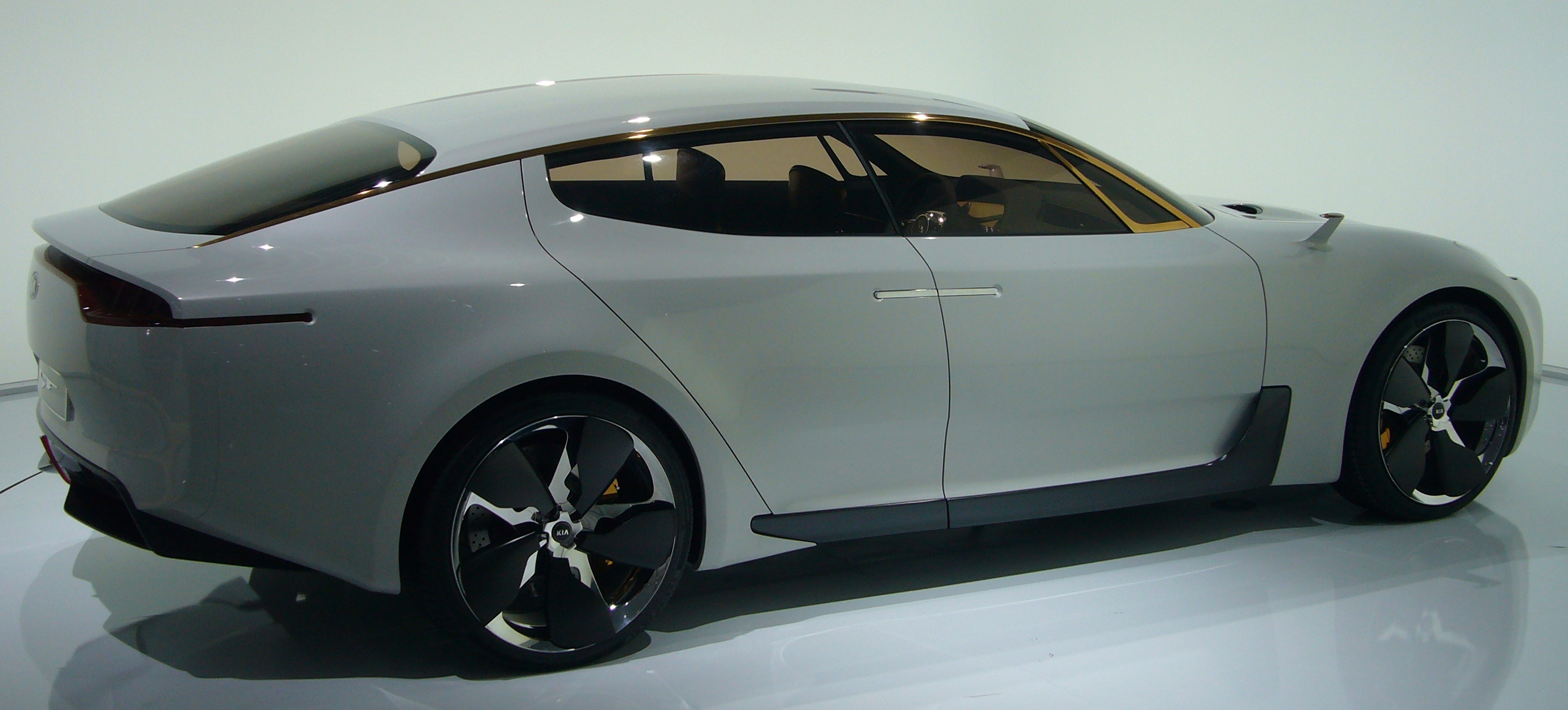
Rear view

Unveiled at the 2011 Frankfurt Motor Show, the GT Concept is a 4-door, rear-wheel-drive sedan featuring suicide doors and a 390 bhp (291 kW; 395 PS) 3.3-litre turbocharged V6 with a 6-speed automatic transmission.

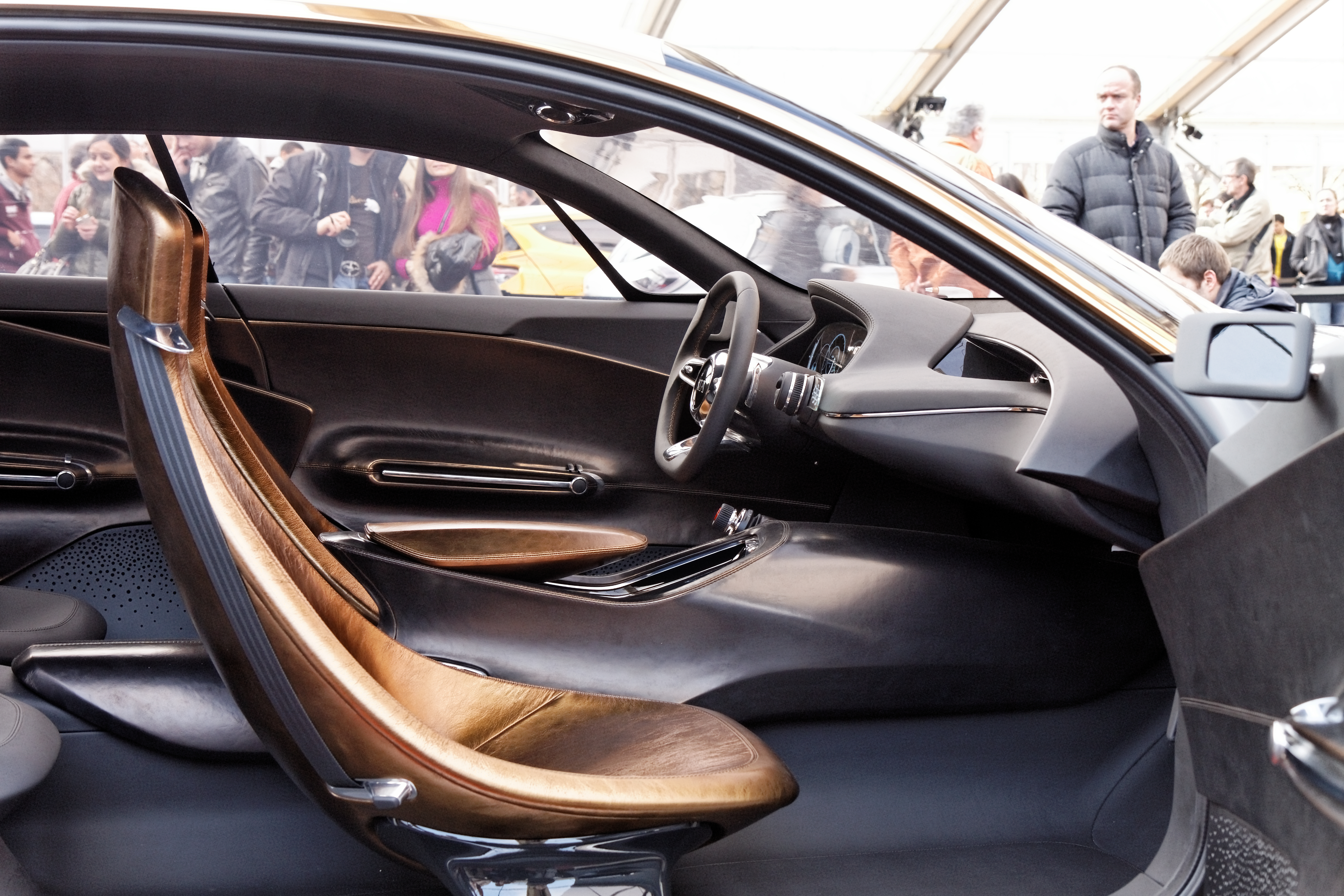
Interior

=== Production ===
The car became the design basis for the Kia K9 and the Kia Stinger.
