= Ball camera =

Type of camera

A ball camera or camera ball is a spherical camera, often designed to be thrown into the air to capture panoramic images from a height or in hazardous environments. Several models of "throwable ball cameras" have been developed in the 2010s. In 2017, a floating version intended for use in zero-gravity environments was introduced aboard the International Space Station; this model was dubbed the Int-Ball (or JEM Internal Ball Camera).

== See also ==
- Panono
