= Insta360 =

Chinese camera company

- Native name: 影石创新科技股份有限公司
- Type: Public
- Traded as: SSE: 688775
- ISIN: CNE1000070C9
- Industry: Technology; videography; photography; consumer electronics
- Founded: 2015
- Founder: JK Liu
- Headquarters: Shenzhen, Guangdong, China
- Area served: Worldwide
- Products: Action camera; 360 camera; Video editing software; Mobile apps
- Brands: Insta360
- Revenue: 780,000,000 United States dollar (2024)
- Divisions: North America; Japan; China; Europe
- Website: insta360.com

Arashi Vision Inc. (Chinese: 影石创新科技股份有限公司; pinyin: Yǐngshí Chuàngxīn Kējì Gǔfèn Yǒuxiàn Gōngsī), doing business as Insta360, is a Chinese camera and imaging technology company headquartered in Shenzhen, China with offices in Los Angeles, Tokyo and Berlin. It produces action cameras, 360-degree cameras, and stereoscopic 180-degree cameras, as well as video editing software for mobile and desktop platforms. Its products are used in action sports, travel recording, and other outdoor video applications. It has collaborated with Leica Camera on imaging technology, including action cameras such as the Insta360 Ace Pro series.

Insta360 has engaged in sponsorships of sports events and partnerships with athletes and content creators, including serving as an official action camera sponsor for events such as the SuperMotorcross World Championship and MotoAmerica. As of 2026, it was a leading manufacturer of panoramic cameras and a competitor to DJI in the global smart camera market, holding a 73% share of the global 360-degree camera market.

== History ==
Insta360 CEO J. K. Liu (刘靖康) met his co-founders while studying computer science at Nanjing University. Liu recognized the potential of 360 when he attended a music concert and wanted to develop products to record and share such powerfully moving events.

Liu's first product was a smartphone app for live streaming, but he quickly expanded the firm's product portfolio by developing an accessory to turn a smartphone into a 360-degree camera.

After graduating, Liu and his team moved to Shenzhen and founded Insta360 in 2015 to begin developing and manufacturing 360-degree cameras as they found the current market standard did not fulfill their needs. Insta360 later began to recognise the benefits of 360 video go far beyond standard 360 video, and began pioneering a new type of action camera, a 360 action camera that uses 360 video as a tool to create traditional flat framed content. This was with the first in the ONE series, Insta360 ONE.

Since then, Insta360 has also opened offices in Los Angeles, Tokyo, and Berlin and it hosts more than 500 employees globally.

In 2020, Insta360 entered a strategic partnership with Leica to help produce the ONE R 1-Inch Edition. Since then, ONE R has been recognised as one of TIME magazine's best inventions of 2020. A recent milestone for the company was Apple hosting Insta360 cameras in stores in over 100 countries.

In 2018, NASA used Insta360 Pro and Pro 2 to live stream the landing of the InSight Mars Lander from mission control, winning an Emmy for the project. In 2021, NASA again used Insta360 Pro 2 to live stream from mission control when the Perseverance rover landed on Mars.

In June 2025, Insta360 held its initial public offering and became a listed company on the Shanghai Stock Exchange STAR Market.

In September 2026, The Verge reported that Insta360 lead the global 360-degree camera market with a share of 73%. In October 2026, the Financial Times reported that Insta360 and DJI had both overtaken GoPro as the leading players in the handheld smart camera market and described strong competition between the two companies. Citing consultancy firm IDC, the newspaper reported that in the second quarter of 2026, DJI held 73% of the global handheld smart camera market while Insta360 held 20%, while also noting that Insta360 dominated the niche categories such as panoramic cameras.

== Product lines ==
=== 360 Cameras ===
==== Insta360 X6 ====
oblique view of the Insta360 X6

The Insta360 X6 was released in 2026 and offers two square 1/1.1" sensors, 8K50 video resolution and a larger battery with 2600 mAh.

==== Insta360 X5 ====
Launched on 22nd April 2025, Insta360 X5 is the successor to the X4 and offers 144% larger sensors at 1/1.28" size. It also introduced user swappable lenses.

==== Insta360 X4 ====
Launched in April 2024, the Insta360 X4 is the successor to the Insta360 X3 and other X Series cameras. It's a waterproof 360-degree action camera with 8K resolution at 30 frames per second (fps), 5.7K at 60 fps, and 4K at 100 fps, adding higher resolution and frame rates to 360-degree capture. The 8K30 video capability is the highest resolution so far in an Insta360 action camera.

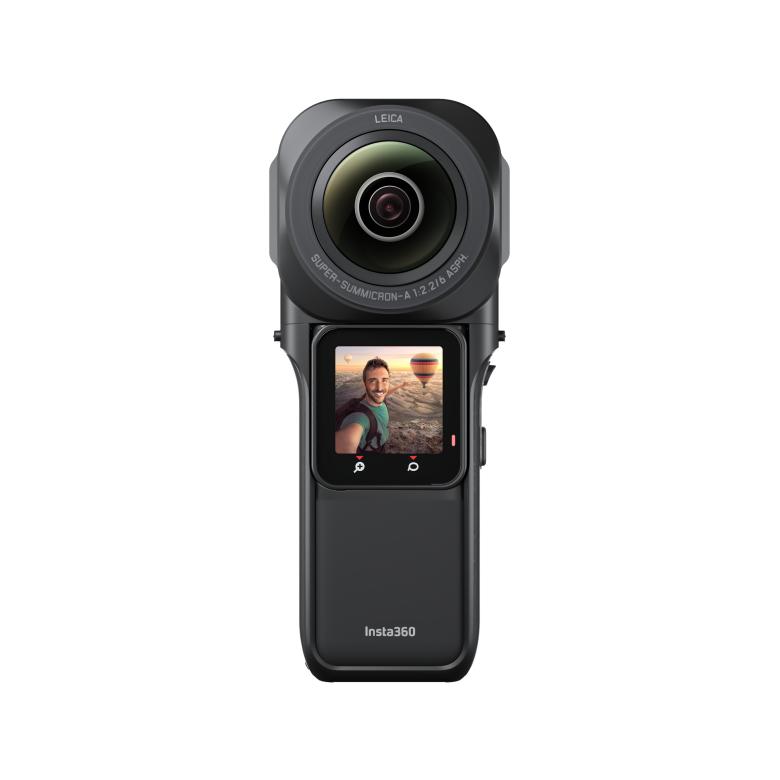
Insta360 ONE RS 1-Inch 360

The 360-degree capture allows users to reframe their footage and find their best angles after filming, using AI or manual editing on the Insta360 mobile app or desktop software Insta360 Studio. It features the Invisible Selfie Stick effect, which automatically removes the Invisible Selfie Stick for third-person angles. The X4 also functions as a traditional wide-angle action cam with Single-Lens Mode, which films with just one of the lenses to shoot first-person POV shots up to 4K60fps.

==== Insta360 X3 ====
Launched in September 2022, the Insta360 X3 is the successor of the Insta360 ONE X2. It is a waterproof 360 action camera, with new 1/2" 48MP sensors and a 2.29" touchscreen allowing for 5.7K 360-degree video with Active HDR. It is also capable of capturing 72MP photos and 8K 360 timelapses. It also features AI reframing and extensive editing features.

In August 2023, Insta360 announced the release of the Insta360 X3 Invisible Dive Kit, set to redefine how people film their underwater adventures. For the first time, diving and action sports creators can unlock all of X3's creative possibilities for underwater use, including the Invisible Selfie Stick effect, 360 filming and reframing, and more.

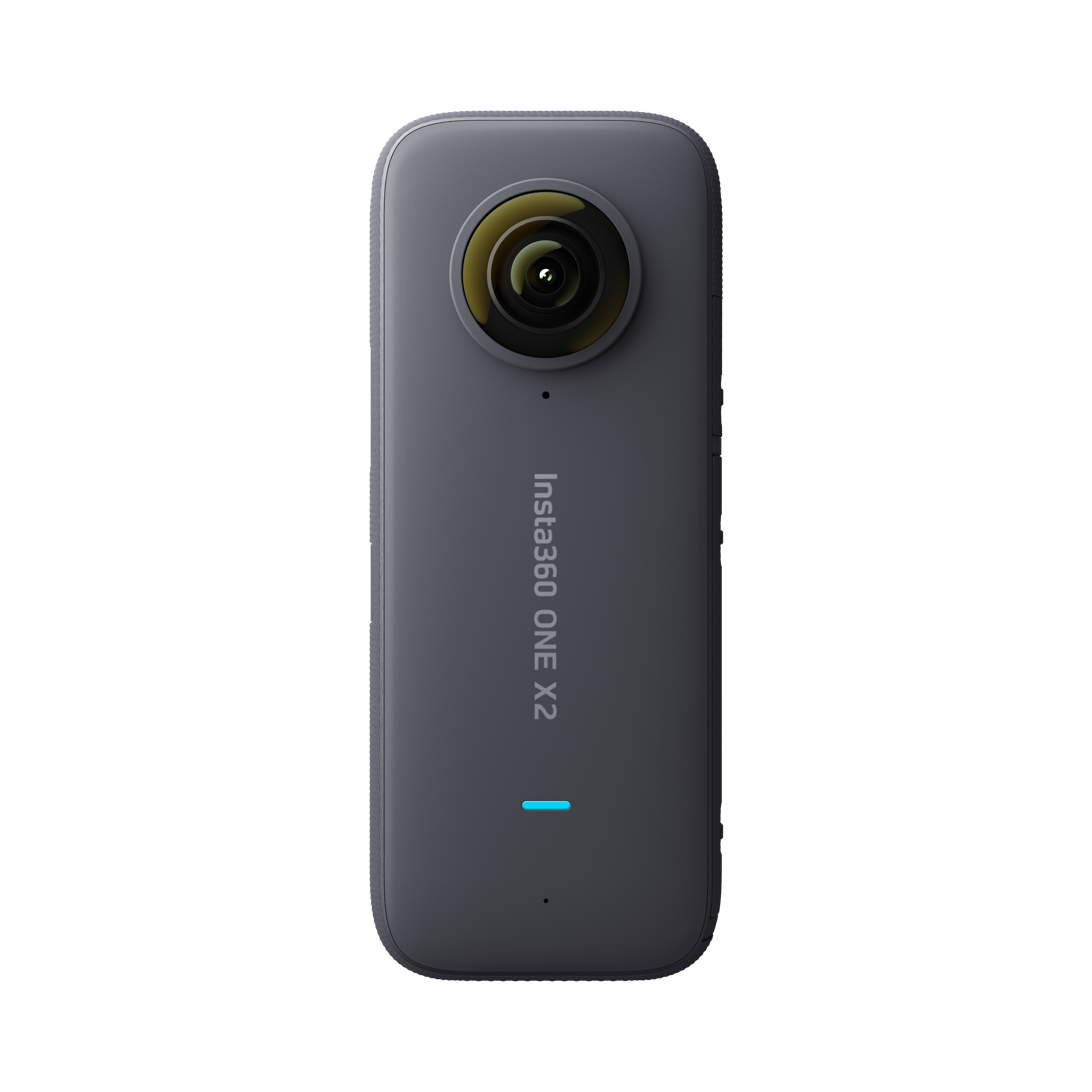
Insta360 ONE X2

==== Insta360 ONE RS 1-Inch 360 ====
Launched in June 2022, The 1-Inch 360 Edition is the first 360 camera from Insta360 with dual 1-inch sensors and the first 360 camera co-engineered with Leica. The 1-Inch 360 Lens drastically improves low light performance and takes 360 image quality to new heights. Along with the new lens, the 1-Inch 360 Edition comes with a new Vertical Battery Base and a Mounting Bracket to secure the camera.

==== Insta360 ONE X2 ====
The Insta360 ONE X2 camera was released on 27 October 2020, as the successor to the ONE X. It is a dual-lens 360 action camera that shoots 5.7K 360-degree video and is waterproof to 10 meters.

=== Action cameras ===
==== Insta360 Ace & Ace Pro ====
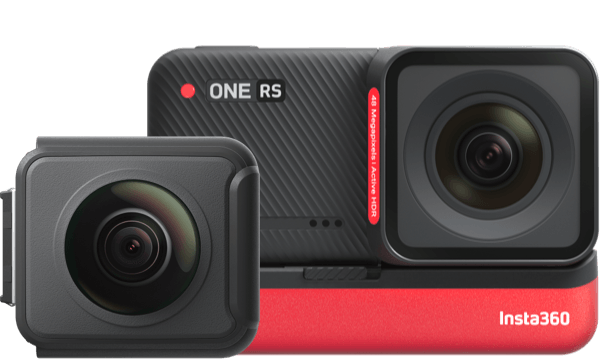
Insta360 ONE RS

Launched in November 2023, Insta360 Ace and Insta360 Ace Pro are a pair of wide-angle action cameras that delivers smarter action capture through AI features and leading image quality. The flagship version of the camera is Insta360 Ace Pro, co-engineered with Leica. It features a 1/1.3" sensor with the ability to capture 4K120fps video, 48MP photos, and new PureVideo for optimal low light shooting. Insta360 Ace is the entry-level option, with the key difference being a smaller 1/2" 48MP sensor.

==== Insta360 ONE RS ====
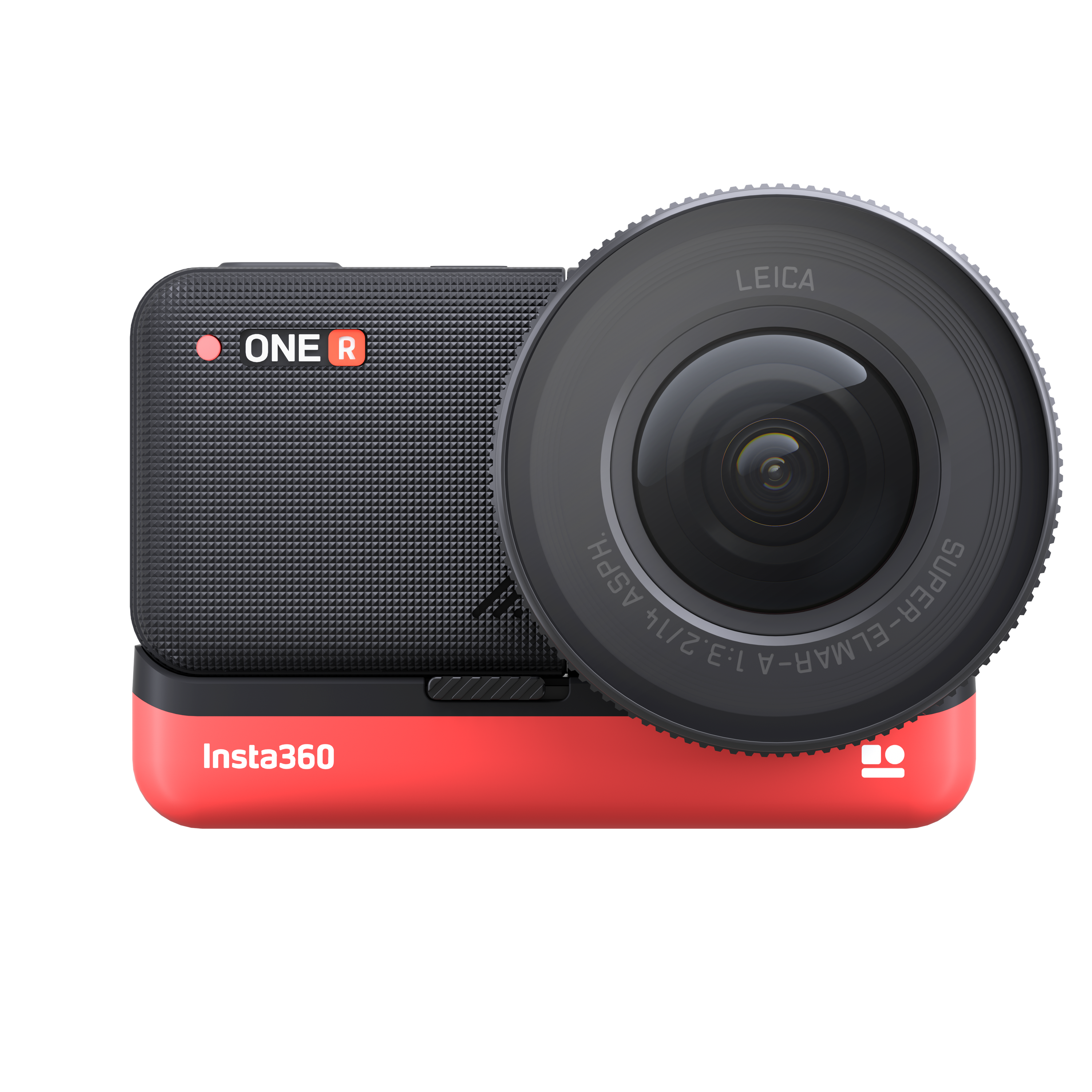
Insta360 ONE R 1-Inch

Launched in March 2022, Insta360 ONE RS is a waterproof interchangeable lens action cam. A new 4K Boost Lens with a 1/2" image sensor shoots 4K 60fps wide angle video and 48MP photos. The Core has a new processor for improved in-camera stabilization, an additional mic and faster WiFi. The new lens and Core are cross-compatible with the preceding ONE R generation as well, including the 5.7K 360 Lens and the 5.3K 1-Inch Wide Angle Lens co-engineered with Leica. By switching lenses, users can shoot both 4K action videos and 360-degree videos using the same device.

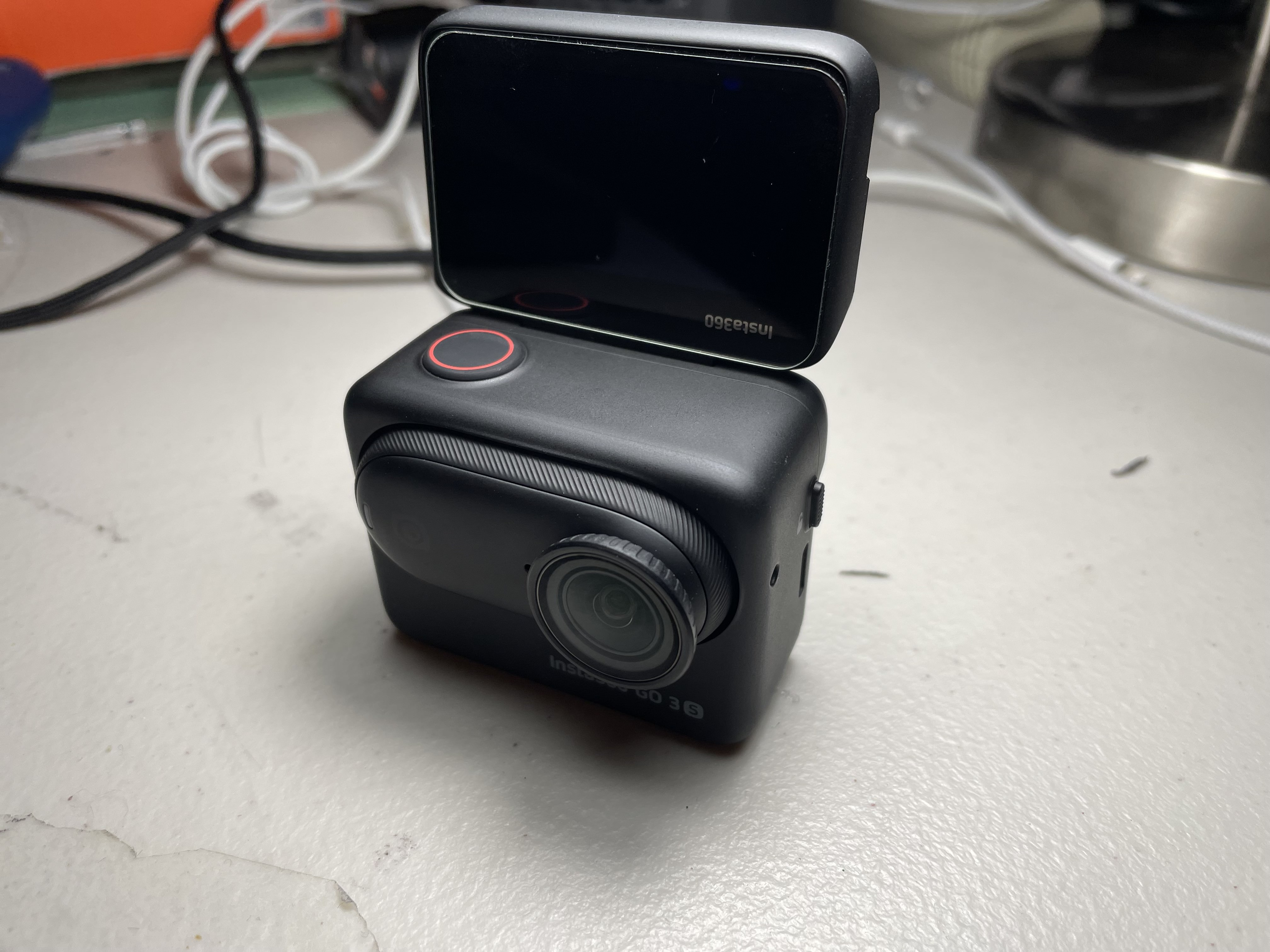
Insta360 GO 3S in black with screen flipped

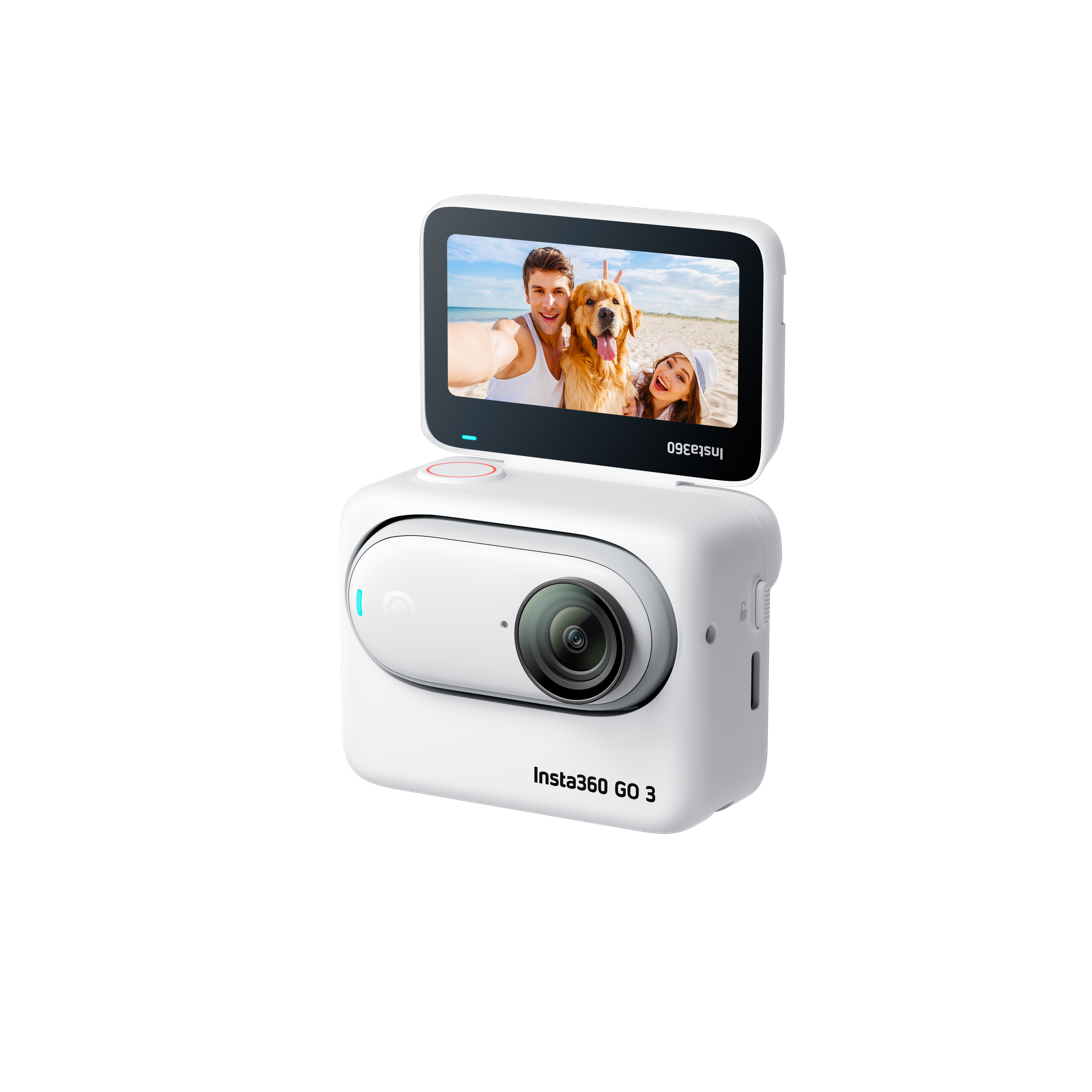
Insta360 GO 3

==== Insta360 ONE R ====
Launched in January 2020, Insta360 ONE R is a waterproof modular action cam with interchangeable lenses. Three lenses are currently available: The 4K Wide Angle Lens, 360 Lens, and the 5.3K 1-Inch Wide-Angle Lens, co-engineered with Leica. It can be used as a traditional action camera with the 4K or 1-Inch lenses, or as a 360-degree camera with the 360 Lens. A new in-camera stabilization mode "Quick FlowState" was added in November 2021 for 4K 50fps, 30fps, 25fps and 24fps video modes.

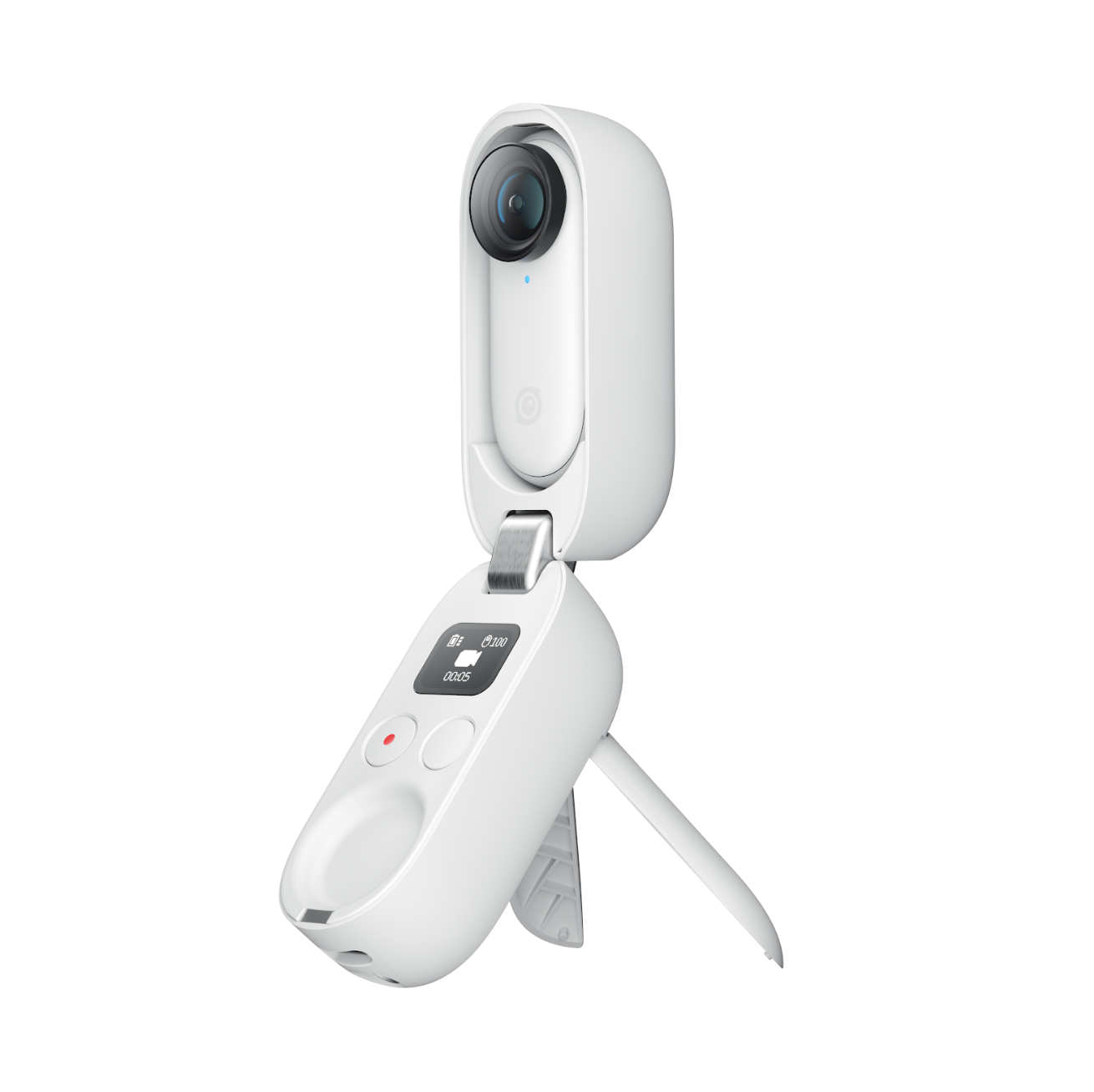
Insta360 GO2

=== GO series cameras ===
==== Insta360 GO 3 & GO 3S ====
Launched in June 2023, Insta360 GO 3 is a tiny, waterproof action camera with a rugged, magnetic body. In April 2024, Insta360 introduced Insta360 GO 3S, a new addition to its GO camera series. Weighing 39 grams, it features the same magnetic design and Action Pod as GO 3 with several key upgrades, notably 4K30 video resolution for improved image quality. The old Insta360 GO 3 could only shoot at 2.7K with a maximum framerate of 30 fps. It also features new Interval Video mode, Apple Find My network compatibility and waterproofing to 33 feet (10 meters).

==== Insta360 GO 2 ====
Released in March 2021, Insta360 GO 2 is a wearable action camera that weighs 26.5 grams (0.93 oz). It has a magnetic body and comes with five accessories, including a pendant, hat clip, stand, lens protector and charge case. The camera is IPX8 waterproof to 13 ft, has a 1/2.3" sensor and shoots 1440p stabilized video. The charge case can be used as a remote to control the camera over Bluetooth, as well as to charge the camera.

Insta360 GO 2 is a compact and lightweight camera designed for capturing action shots and everyday moments. It features HyperSmooth video stabilization, 6-axis image stabilization, 360-degree capture, and a variety of shooting modes including timelapse and slow motion. The camera is waterproof and can be controlled through the accompanying mobile app, allowing for easy editing and sharing of footage.

=== Professional VR cameras ===
Insta360 also creates VR 360 cameras made for professionals. This line includes the Pro, the Pro 2, and the Titan. They all shoot high-resolution content designed for consumption in VR, or as traditional 360 video.

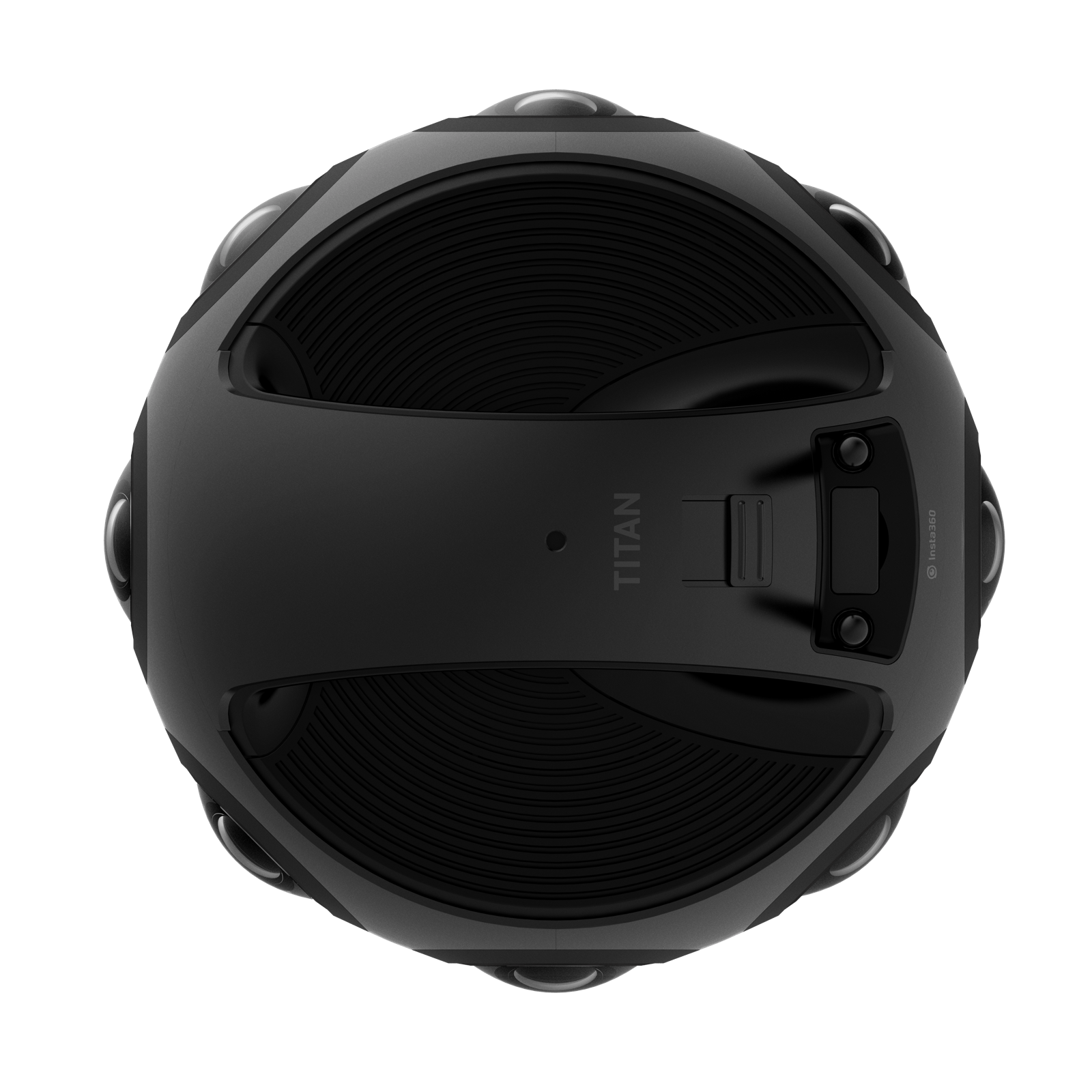
Insta360 Titan

==== Insta360 Titan ====
Insta360 Titan is a unibody 360 VR camera with eight lenses and eight Micro Four Thirds sensors. Shooting modes include 11K at 30fps Video, 10K 3D 30fps Video and 11K 360 Photo in 3D and monoscopic formats, as well as up to 8K VR live streaming. Titan is also equipped with Insta360's FlowState stabilization.

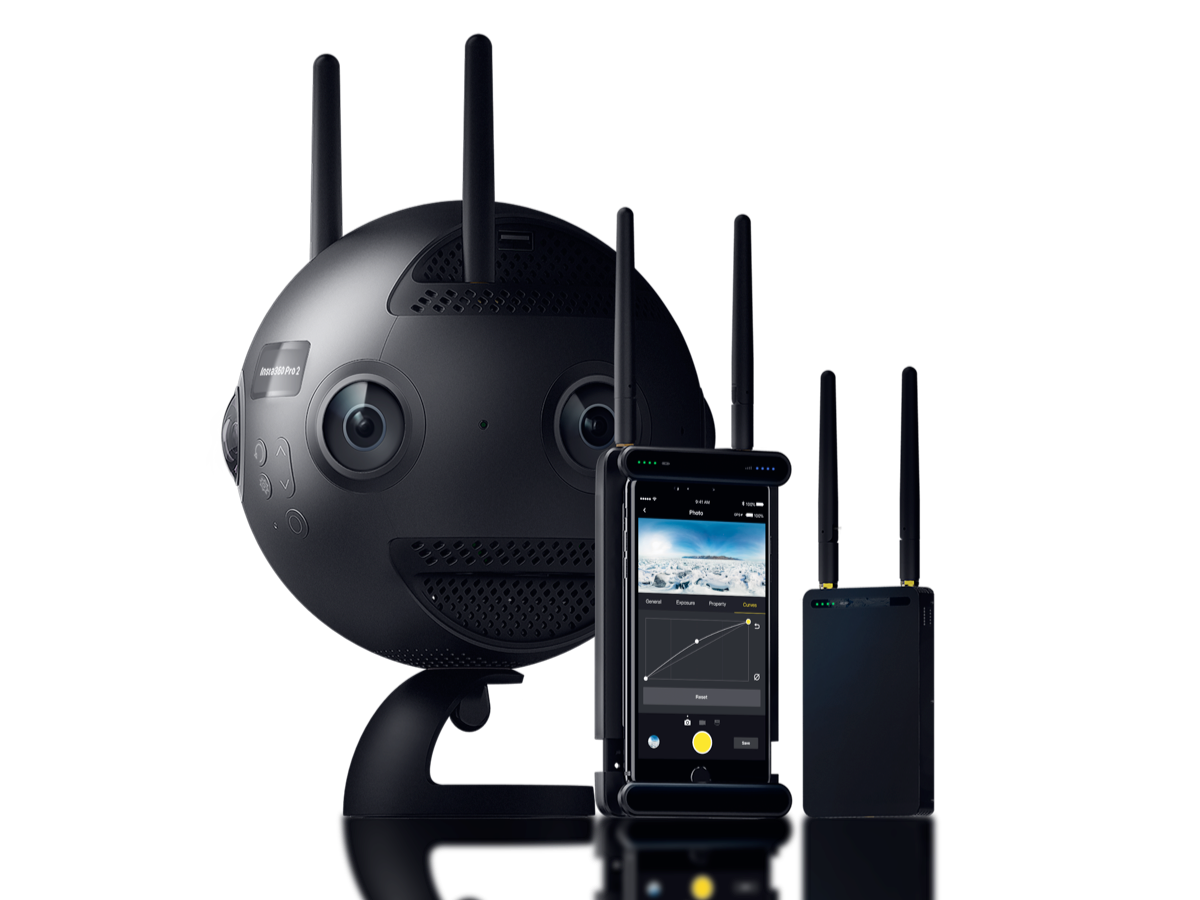
Insta360 Pro 2

==== Insta360 Pro 2 ====
Insta360 Pro 2 is a unibody 360 VR camera with 6 lenses that shoots 8K video and photos in 3D and monoscopic formats, and supports up to 8K VR live streaming. Pro 2 is also equipped with Insta360's FlowState stabilization.

=== Webcams ===
==== Insta360 Link 2 & Link 2C ====
On September 24, 2024, the Insta360 launched the Link 2 and Link 2C webcams.

The Insta360 Link 2 is the successor to the Insta360 Link. It is a 4K webcam equipped with a 2-axis gimbal and built-in AI tracking algorithms, enabling the camera to pan and tilt to follow the subject. It improves on the original model with easier magnetic mounting, group tracking, and expanded hand gesture controls.

The Insta360 Link 2C is a more affordable, "lite" version of the Insta360 Link 2. It retains key features such as a 1/2” sensor, 4K image quality, AI-powered framing, gesture control, and magnetic mounting. However, it lacks the integrated gimbal, meaning the camera remains in a fixed position without panning or tilting capabilities.

Insta360 Link

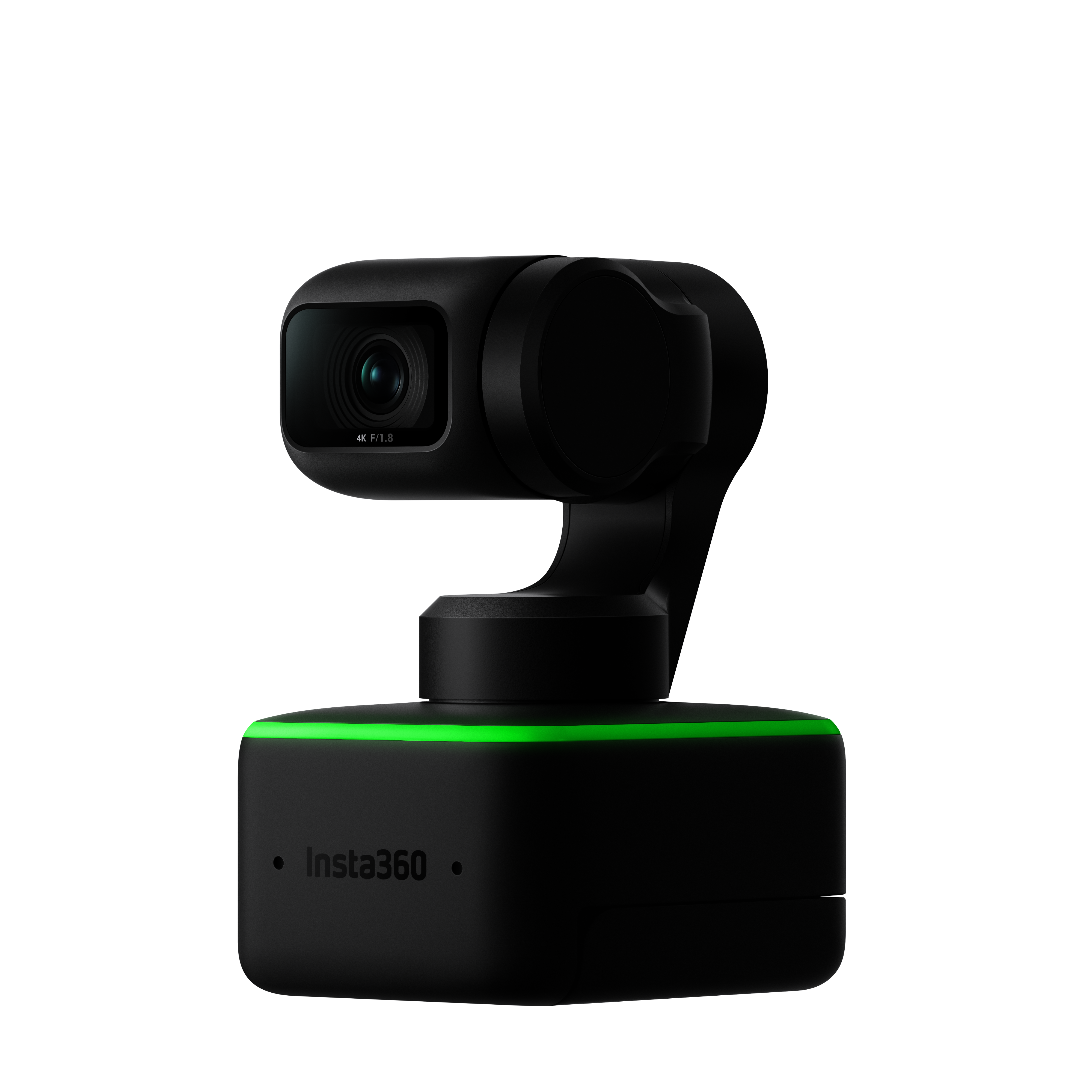
Insta360 Link

Launched in August 2022, Insta360 Link is an AI-powered 4K webcam designed for business professionals, educators and live streamers. It features a 3-axis gimbal and built-in AI algorithms to track and follow the user. Specialized modes are available for whiteboard enhancement, portrait live streaming and more. Link connects to a computer via USB cable and can be mounted with a built-in clip or 1/4-inch (6.4 mm) mounting point. The Link is configured by a desktop software suite.

=== Gimbals ===
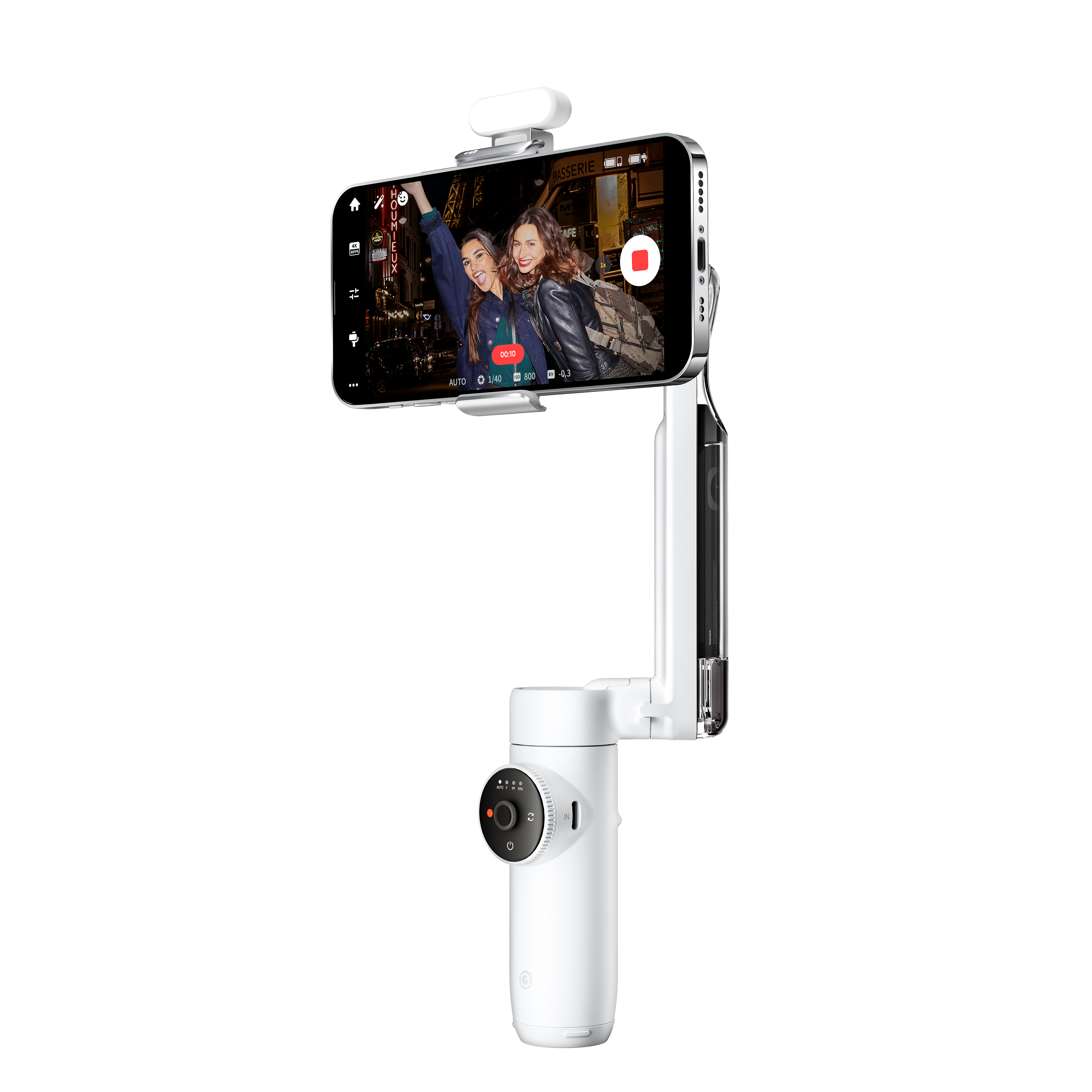
Insta360 Flow

Insta360 Flow & Flow Pro

Launched in March 2023, Insta360 Flow is an AI-tracking smartphone stabilizer. In July 2024, Insta360 introduced Insta360 Flow Pro, the next gimbal in the Insta360 Flow product line. It is the first gimbal to integrate Apple's subject-tracking DockKit technology, allowing users to track with the iPhone's native camera app and over 200 third-party iOS apps.

=== Aerial cameras ===
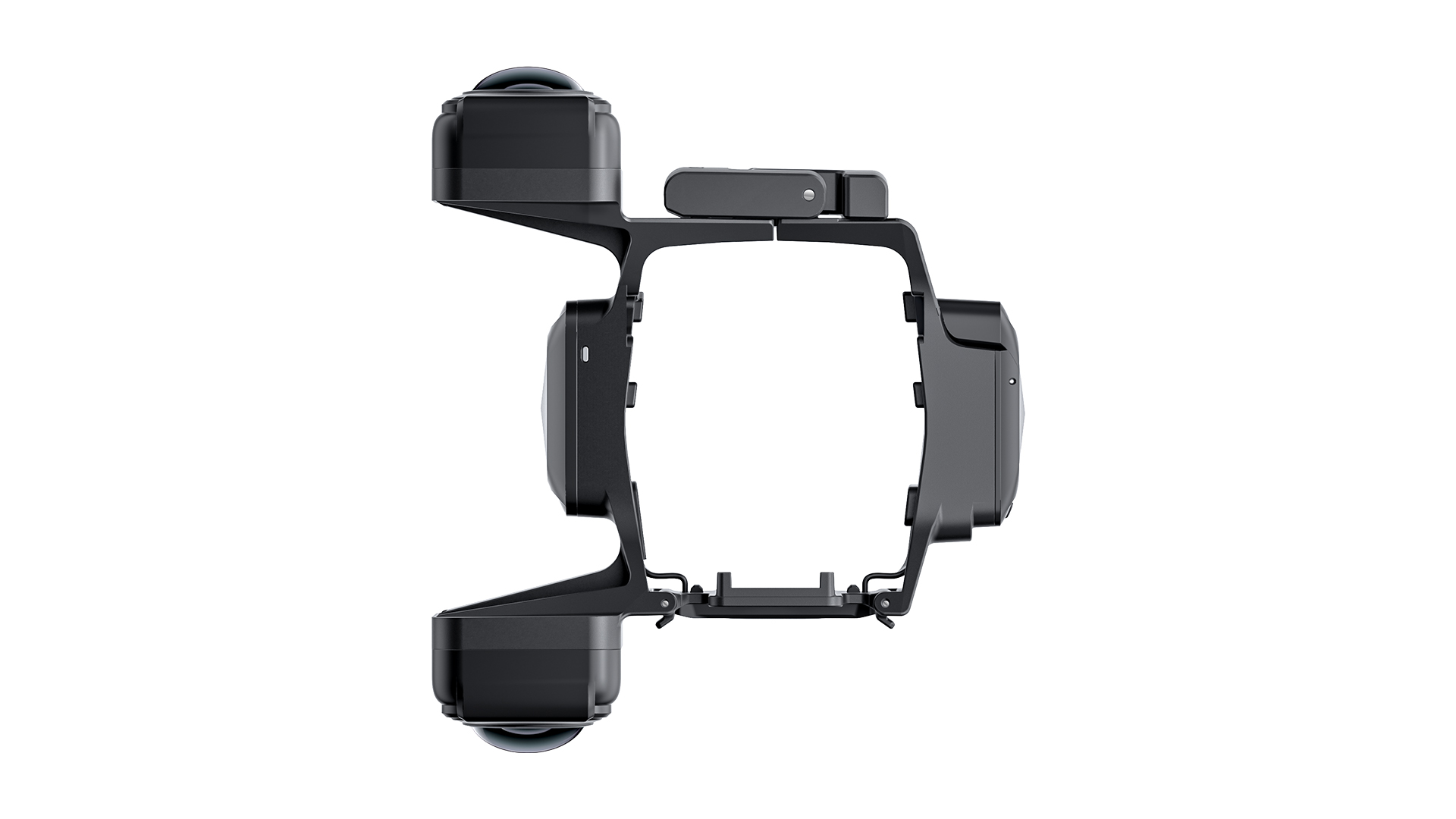
Insta360 Sphere

Insta360 Sphere

Launched in May 2022, Insta360 Sphere is compatible with the DJI Mavic Air 2/2S and attaches to the drone with a locking mechanism, offering improvements in footage capture in comparison to traditional onboard cameras. The camera films in 5.7K 360, with the option for users to adjust the angle and camera direction of their video after capture. With the camera attached, the drone can be rendered invisible in 360-degree footage. Sphere users can edit their videos using the AI-powered features in the Insta360 app, supporting both Android and Apple products.

=== The Insta360 app ===
The app for iOS and Android is developed for use alongside Insta360 ONE X2, ONE R and GO 2. The Insta360 app is made for editing both 360 and flat framed content, then exporting it to share or save. It has editing tools as well as AI-assisted templates in what Insta360 calls "Shot Lab" to make 360 editing less cumbersome, and make creative 360 techniques easier. The app also has a community section, where creators from around the world share tips, discuss and share their content shot on Insta360 cameras.

=== Insta360 Studio ===
Insta360 Studio is a free desktop video editing software for Mac and Windows computers. It can be used for editing footage shot on Insta360's consumer cameras, including X2, X3, X4, ONE X/X2, ONE RS/R, ONE, GO 2/3, Sphere, EVO and Nano S. A new interface was introduced in September 2021, for easier project management.
