= Omnidirectional camera =

Camera that can see in all directions

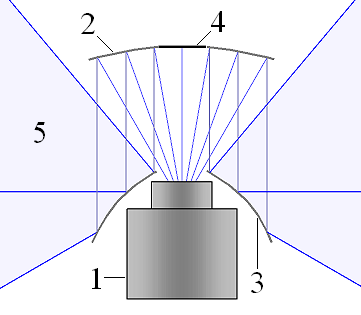
Schematic of an omnidirectional camera with two mirrors: 1. Camera; 2. Upper Mirror; 3. Lower Mirror; 4. "Black Spot"; 5. Field of View (light blue)

In photography and computer vision, an omnidirectional camera (from "omni", meaning all), also known as 360-degree camera (or 360° camera), is a camera having a field of view that covers at least a full circle (360°) in the horizontal plane. It may be extended vertically up to a full sphere (1 spat), in which case it is also known as a spherical camera. Omnidirectional cameras are important in applications where large visual field coverage is needed, such as in panoramic photography, VR photography, and robotics.

== Overview ==
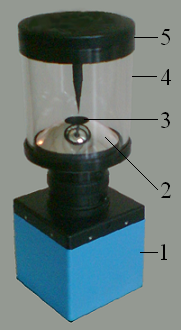
Omnidirectional camera with two mirrors.: 1. Camera; 2. Lower mirror; 3. Aperture; 4. Glass housing; 5. Cover and upper mirror (hidden)

A camera normally has a field of view that ranges from a few degrees to, at most, 180°. This means that it captures, at most, light falling onto the camera focal point through a hemisphere. In contrast, an ideal omnidirectional camera captures light from all directions falling onto the focal point, covering a full sphere. In practice, however, most omnidirectional cameras do not cover the entire sphere. Many cameras which are referred to as omnidirectional cover the full 360° along the equator of the sphere but exclude the top and bottom. In the case that they do cover the full sphere, the captured light rays do not intersect exactly in a single focal point.

Various techniques can be used to generate 360-degree images.

=== Cameras with one lens ===
These models are used with a fisheye lens. The lens bends the angle of the shot to take a larger radius of the selected subject. It is not possible to take a complete 360-degree picture with this technique because there is always a dead angle directly behind the lens.

=== Cameras with two lenses (Dual Fisheye) ===
360-degree cameras with two lenses are probably the most common type, as they can accommodate a full 360-degree angle with two lenses facing each other. A camera takes pictures and videos with an angle of just over 180 degrees, e.g. 220 degrees. These are then converted into a 360-degree object using software. Problems are often caused by stitching errors that can happen at any given time. This means that an incorrect combination of the images can result in an unclean cut edge that is difficult or impossible to remove.

=== Cameras with more than two lenses ===
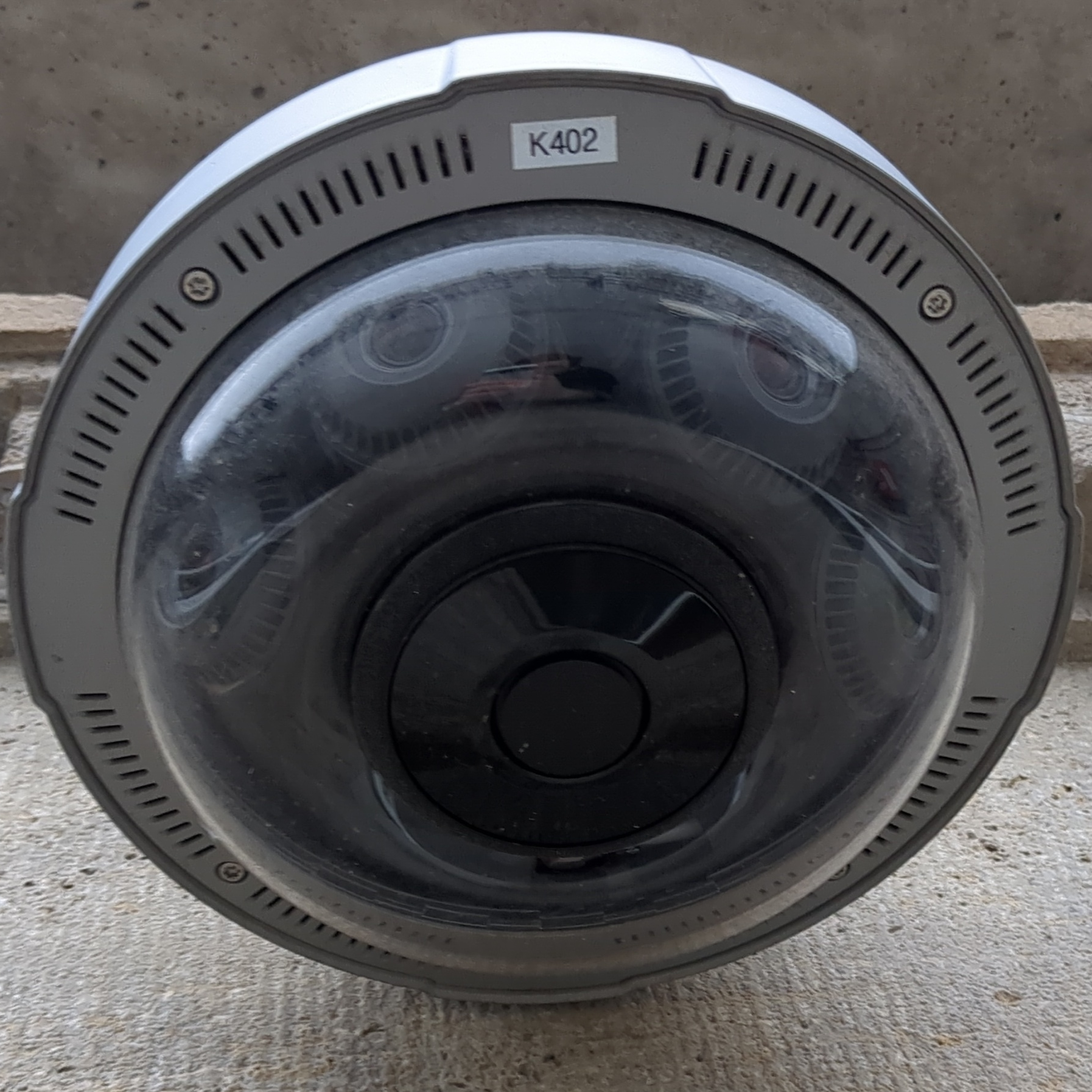
Panorama-style surveillance camera

Depending on the application, manufacturers use more than two camera lenses to produce the images. One of the first cameras was Sony' Fourthview multihead camera and the throwing camera, Panono. It has 36 cameras, which are triggered at the same time at the highest point, if the camera was thrown into the air. The more lenses are installed in the camera, the more difficult it becomes for the software to combine the individual images, however, the possible stitching problems are less with a good stitching.

=== Camera rigs ===
Camera rigs are mostly used for the attachment of 6 conventional Actioncams. GoPro produced one of the first camera rigs. They are available in different versions and connect several single cameras. The cameras are placed in this cube and record the surroundings in all directions.

=== Mosaic based cameras ===
Recording room 360° panoramic (view as a 360° interactive panorama)

If several "normal" cameras are combined in a network, one speaks of mosaic-based cameras. Each of these cameras records a small area of the environment. The individual images are then joined together like mosaic stones to form an omnidirectional overall image. The number of cameras to be used depends on the focal length of the lenses used. The smaller the focal length, the larger the angle of view and the fewer cameras are required.

== Applications ==
=== Cars ===
Cars with omnidirectional camera include Nissan Qashqai, Volvo S90, Range Rover, Peugeot 3008 and Kia Stinger.

=== Panoramic art ===
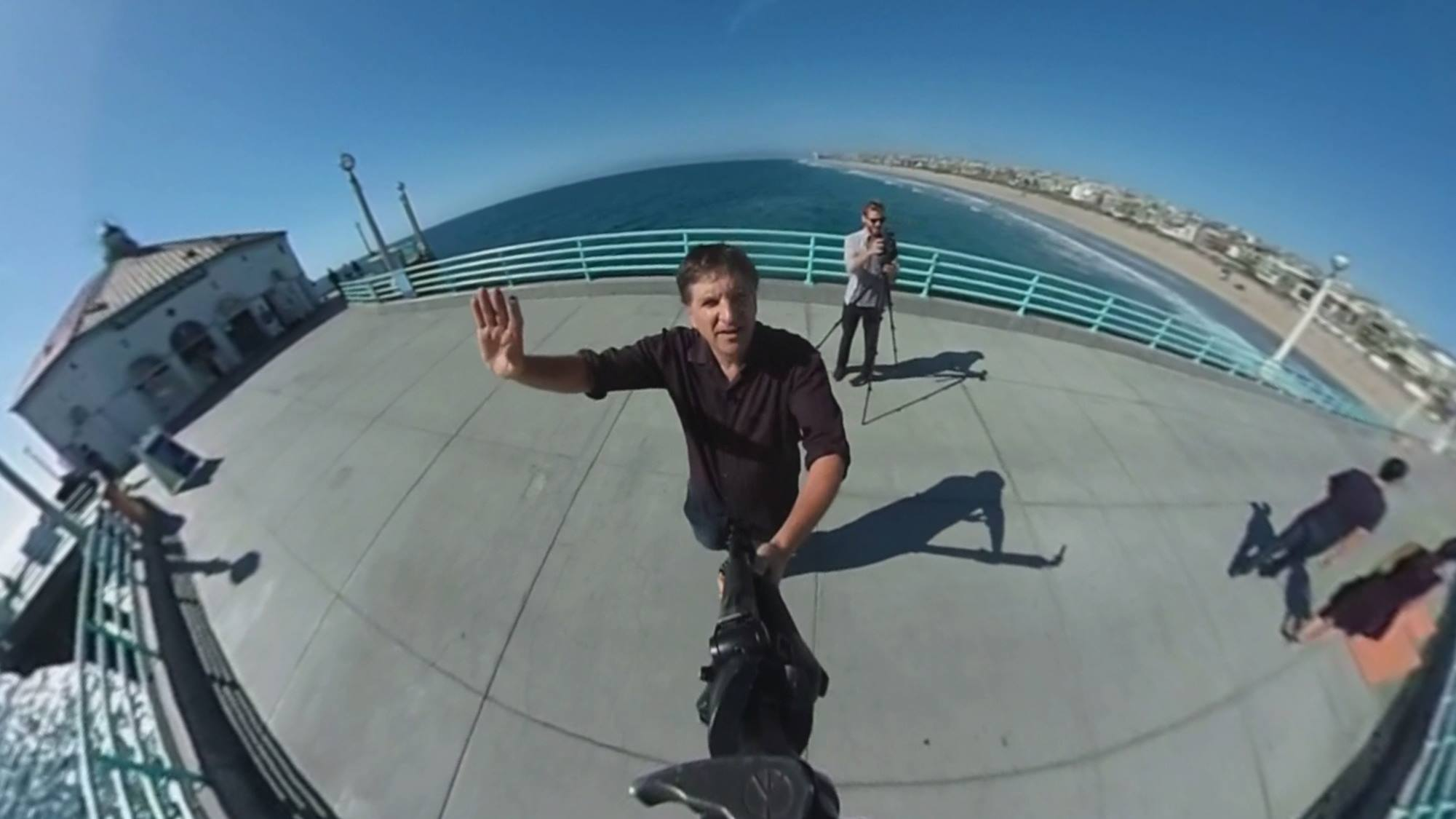
A 360 shot taken by tech journalist Jefferson Graham with a selfie stick

Traditional approaches to panoramic photography mainly consists of stitching shots taken separately into a single, continuous image. The stitching of images, however, is computationally intensive (for example using the RANSAC iterative algorithm, commonly used to solve the correspondence problem), and depending upon the quality and consistency of the shots used, the resulting image might contain a number of deficiencies which impair the quality of the resulting image. In contrast, an omnidirectional camera can be used to create panoramic art in real time, without the need for post processing, and will typically give much better quality products.

In 2015 Facebook began rolling out omnidirectional videos where the user can view the video at any arbitrary camera angle around a 360-degree radius and limited tilt up-and-down angles.

=== Robotics and computer vision ===
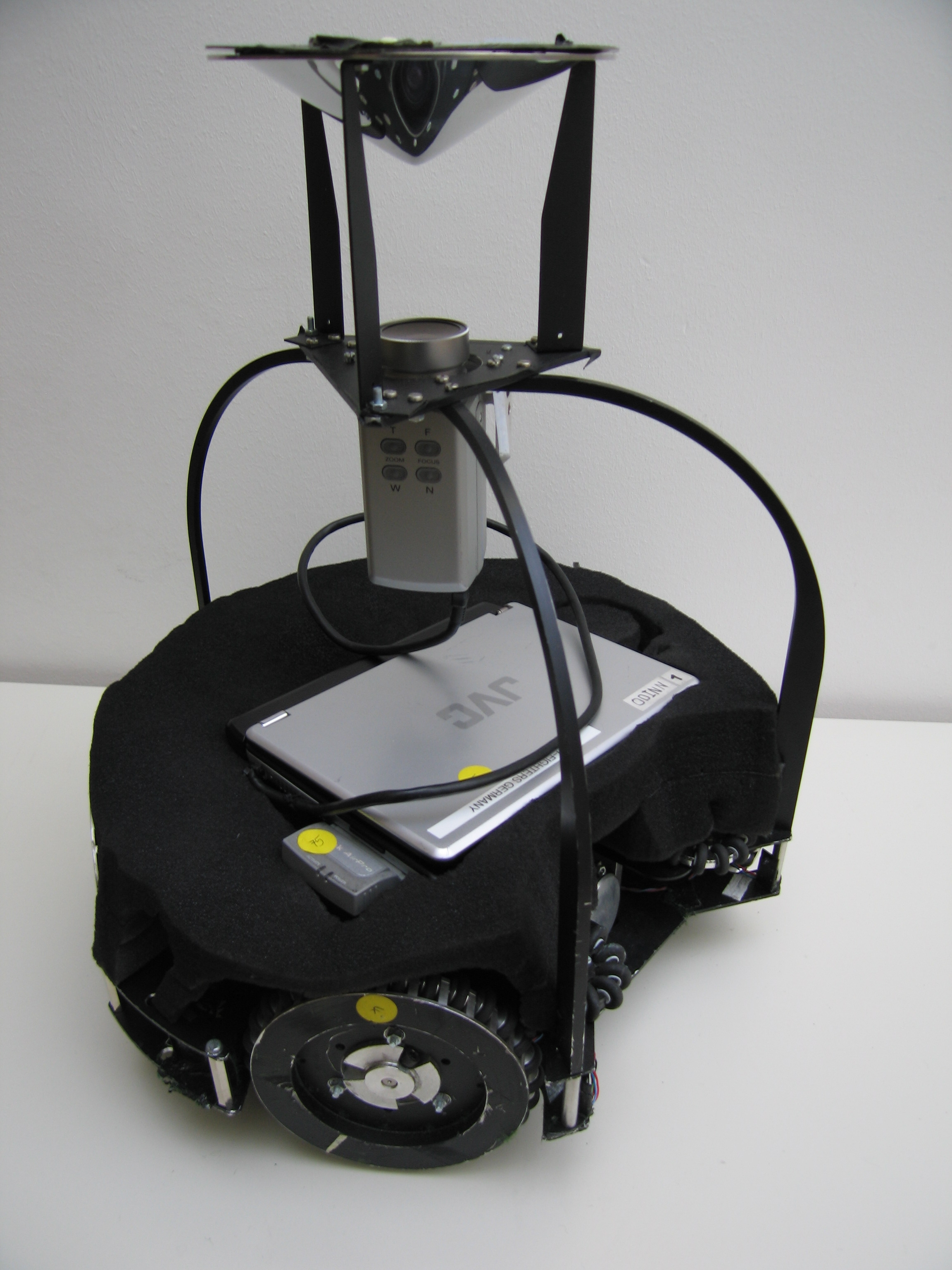
A robot in the RoboCup Midsize league (2005), equipped with an omnidirectional camera.

In robotics, omnidirectional cameras are frequently used for visual odometry and to solve simultaneous localization and mapping (SLAM) problems visually. Due to its ability to capture a 360-degree view, better results can be obtained for optical flow and feature selection and matching.

=== Real Estate ===
Within the real estate industry, 360 camera technology has offered a way for prospective home buyers to tour the home without having to be there in person. An evolution inspired by an increasing amount of homes being purchased sight-unseen. Some commercially available 360 cameras are sold with real estate as the main subject in mind.

=== Miscellaneous ===
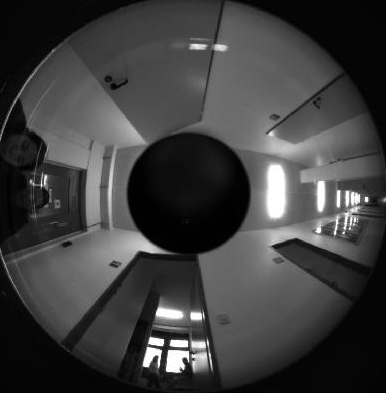
Omnidirectional image of a corridor.

Applications of omnidirectional cameras also include 3D reconstruction and surveillance, when it is important to cover as large a visual field as possible. Microsoft RoundTable was introduced in 2007 for videoconferencing, where all participants on one location can be in the same image.

== Products ==
Several implementations of omnidirectional (360-degree) cameras exist, including two opposing fisheye lens configurations and cameras with more than 30 separate lenses.

There have been fly-by-night companies that have produced prototypes and collected 'backers' on Kickstarter but have not delivered to end-users.

More established 360-camera manufacturers currently actively producing and supporting hardware as of March 2020 include:

- Red Digital Cinema
- Ricoh
- Insta360
- Gear 360
- GoPro
- MadV
- Vuze
- Panono
- Kandao
- Trisio
- FXG

Frequent new models and quality improvements in consumer-marketed 360-cameras are blurring the line between the professional and consumer market.

== See also ==
- 360 panorama
- 360-degree video
- Ball camera
- Immersive video
- Leme panoramic camera
- Light-field camera
- MSG Sphere
- Multiple-camera setup
- Panoramic tripod head
- Pan–tilt–zoom camera (PTZ camera)
- Stereo camera
- VR photography
- Whole sky camera
