= Kia Stinger =

Mid-size car from Kia (2017–2023)

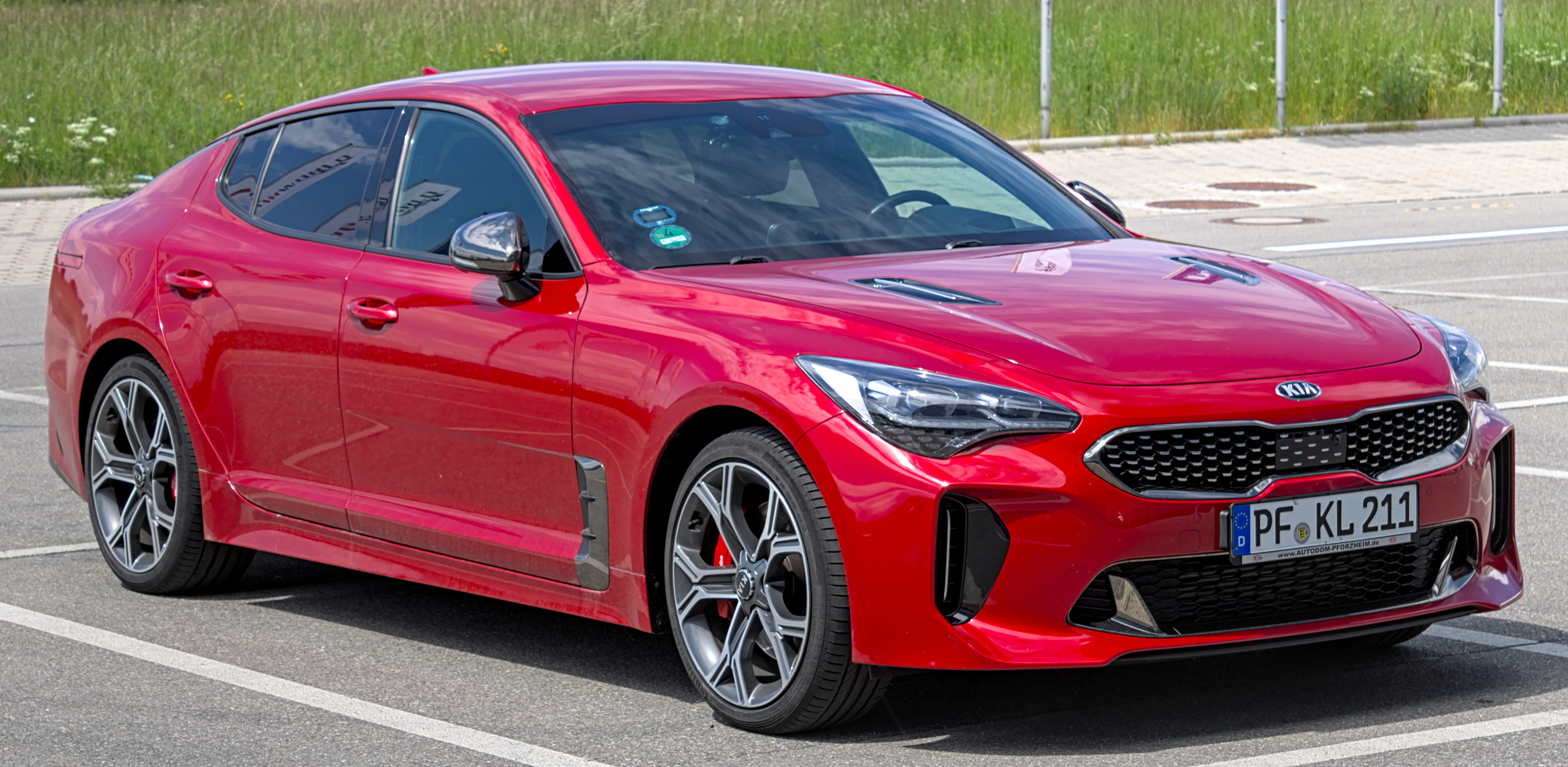

Overview
- Manufacturer: Kia
- Model code: CK
- Production: October 2017 – April 2023
- Model years: 2018–2023
- Assembly: South Korea: Gwangmyeong (Sohari Plant); Russia: Kaliningrad (Avtotor); Kazakhstan: Ust-Kamenogorsk (ASAV)
- Designer: Sang-hun Ahn under Peter Schreyer

Body and chassis
- Class: Mid-size car (D)
- Body style: 5-door liftback/fastback sedan
- Layout: FMR layout; M4 layout
- Platform: Hyundai M2 Platform
- Related: Genesis G70

Powertrain
- Engine: Gasoline: 2.0 L Theta II T-GDi I4; 2.5 L Smartstream FR G2.5 T-GDi I4; 3.3 L Lambda II T-GDi V6; Diesel: 2.2 L R II CRDi I4
- Transmission: 8-speed A8LR1/A8TR1 automatic

Dimensions
- Wheelbase: 2,905 mm (114.4 in)
- Length: 4,830 mm (190.2 in)
- Width: 1,870 mm (73.6 in)
- Height: 1,400 mm (55.1 in)
- Curb weight: 1,638–1,913 kg (3,611–4,217 lb)

The Kia Stinger (Korean: 기아 스팅어) is a mid-size liftback/fastback manufactured by Kia between 2017 and 2023.

== Overview ==
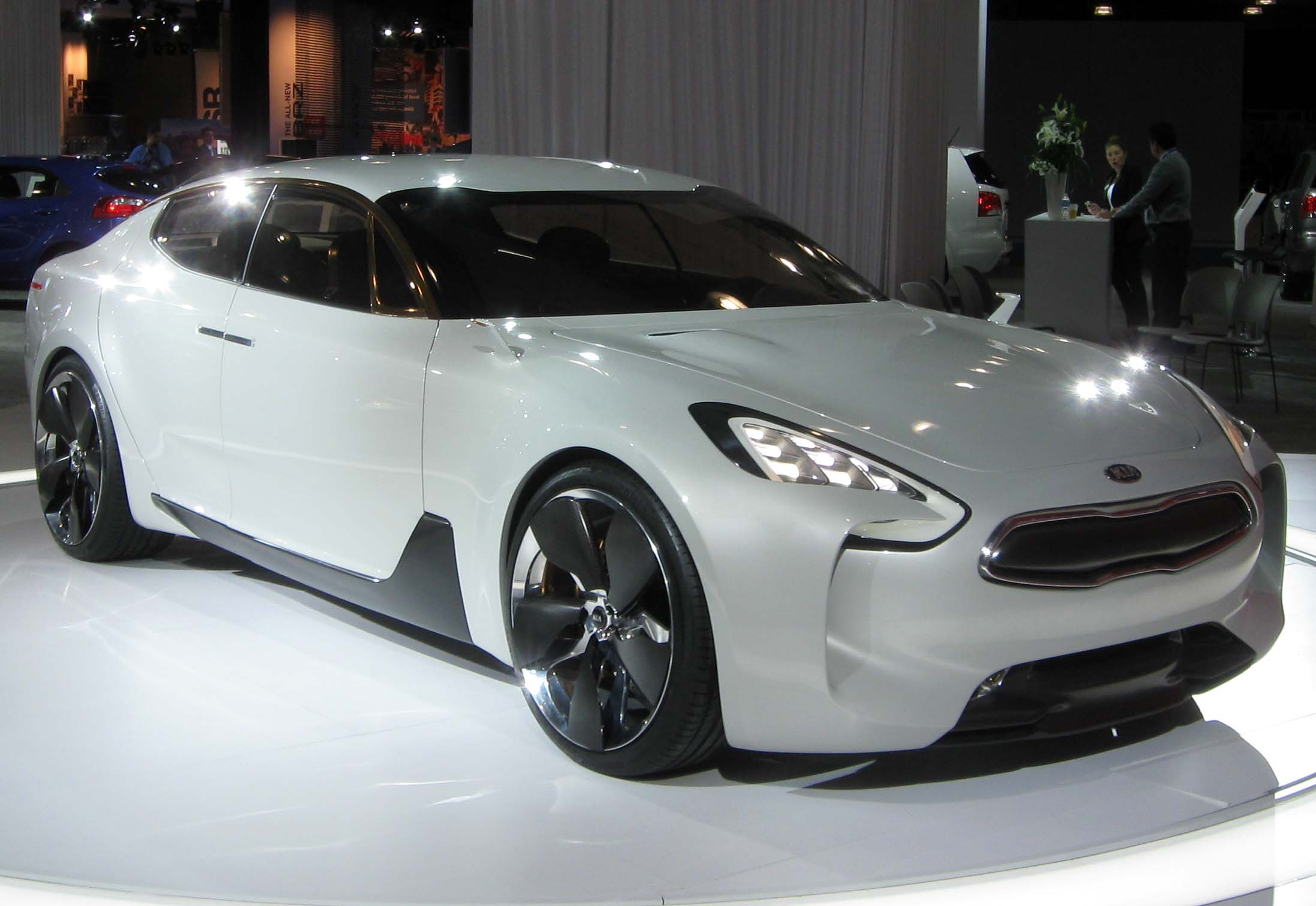
2011 Kia GT concept

The Stinger traces its roots to the GT Concept from the 2011 Frankfurt Motor Show and the Kia GT4 Stinger from the 2014 North American International Auto Show. Design work was led by Peter Schreyer and Gregory Guillaume (Kia's Chief Designer) at Kia's European studio in Frankfurt and engineered by former BMW M Vice President of Engineering Albert Biermann, the car was unveiled at the 2017 North American International Auto Show. Biermann is now the executive vice president of performance development and high performance vehicles of the Hyundai Motor Group.

Testing of the car involved over 1,000 kilometres (620 mi) at the Korea International Circuit and 10,000 kilometres (6,200 mi) at the Nürburgring Nordschleife.

=== Performance ===
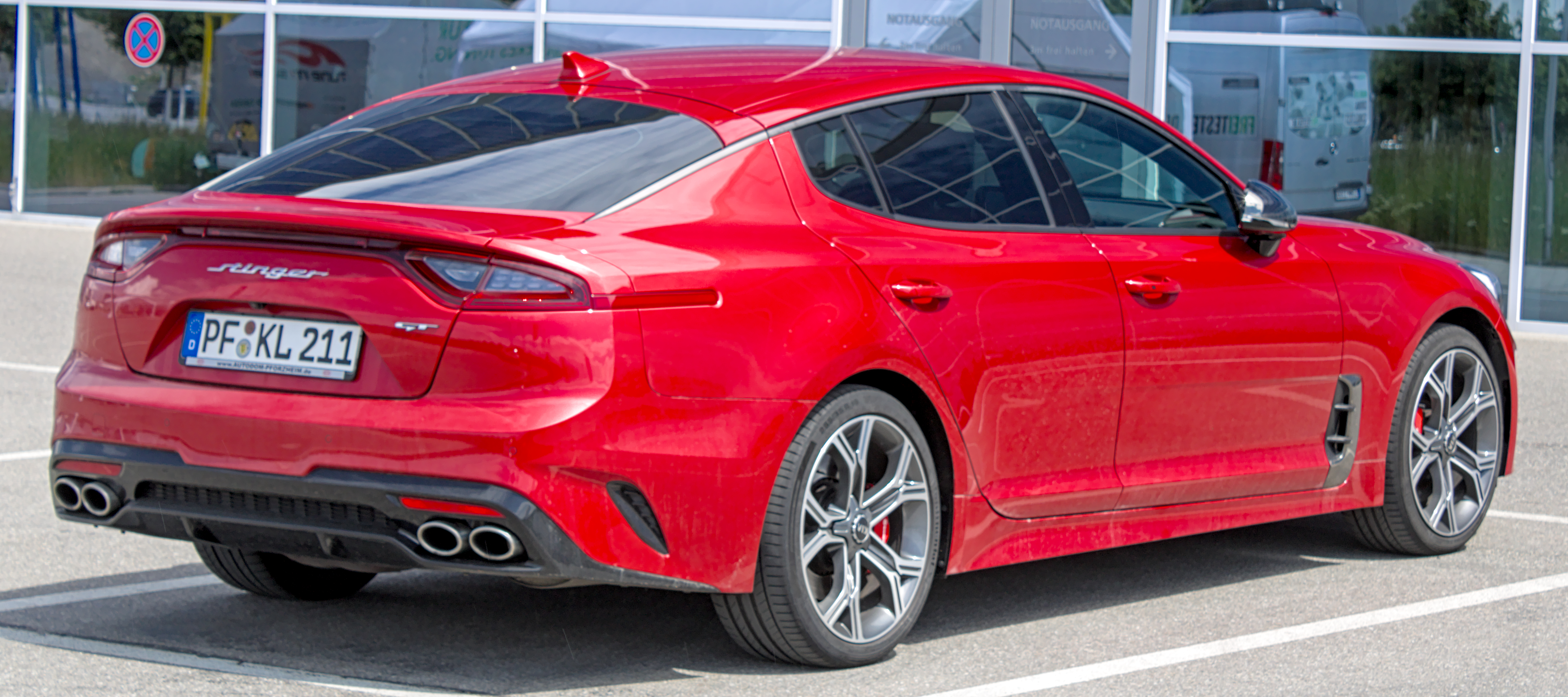
Rear view (pre-facelift)

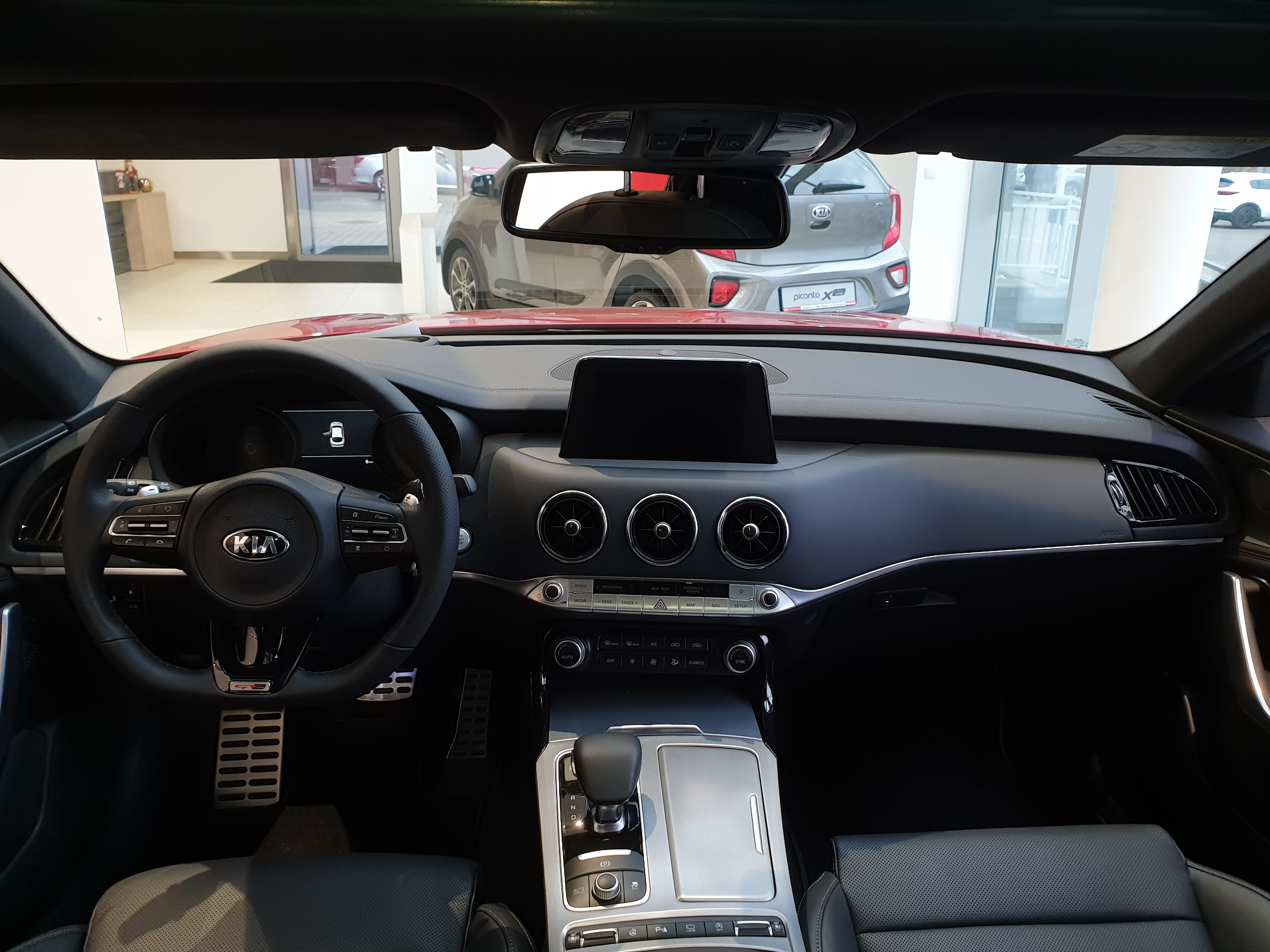
Interior

The Stinger uses a shortened version of the Hyundai Genesis' front-engine, rear-wheel-drive platform with additional steel reinforcement and is offered with a choice of two engines: a 2.0-liter turbocharged four-cylinder that produces 188 kW (255 PS; 252 hp); and a 3,342 cc (3.3 L; 203.9 cu in) twin-turbo V6 engine that generates 272 kW (370 PS; 365 hp) at 6,000 rpm and 510 N⋅m (376 lbf⋅ft) of torque from 1,300-4,500 rpm for the AWD variant. For the European and Korean markets, the Stinger is offered with a base 2.2-liter CRDi diesel I4 that produces 149 kW (202 PS; 199 hp). GT variants are equipped with Brembo brakes and Michelin tires. The sole transmission is an 8-speed automatic with five driving modes plus paddle-shifters.

Kia claims that the Stinger accelerates from zero to 100 km/h (62 mph) in 7.7, 6 and 4.9 seconds for the 2.2-liter diesel, 2.0-liter gasoline and 3.3-liter gasoline respectively. Schreyer reportedly drove a pre-production Stinger GT at a top speed of 269 km/h (167 mph) on the Autobahn, but was allegedly passed by a VW Arteon during the run.

During a test by Car and Driver, an all-wheel-drive U.S. spec GT 3.3T with Michelin Pilot Sport 4 tires achieved 0–60 mph (0–97 km/h) in 4.6 seconds on the track, reached 0.91 g on the skidpad and was able to stop from 70 mph (113 km/h) in 164 feet (50 m). According to this publication, the U.S. model's top speed is governed at 167 mph (269 km/h) per Kia specs. In tests conducted by Motor Trend, the four-cylinder U.S. spec Stinger 2.0 RWD on Bridgestone Potenza tires reached 60 mph (97 km/h) in 6.6 seconds, completed the 1/4-mile (0.4 km) run in 15 seconds and stopped from 60 mph (97 km/h) in 126 feet (38 m). The average lateral acceleration recorded in track testing was 0.85 g.

== Facelift ==
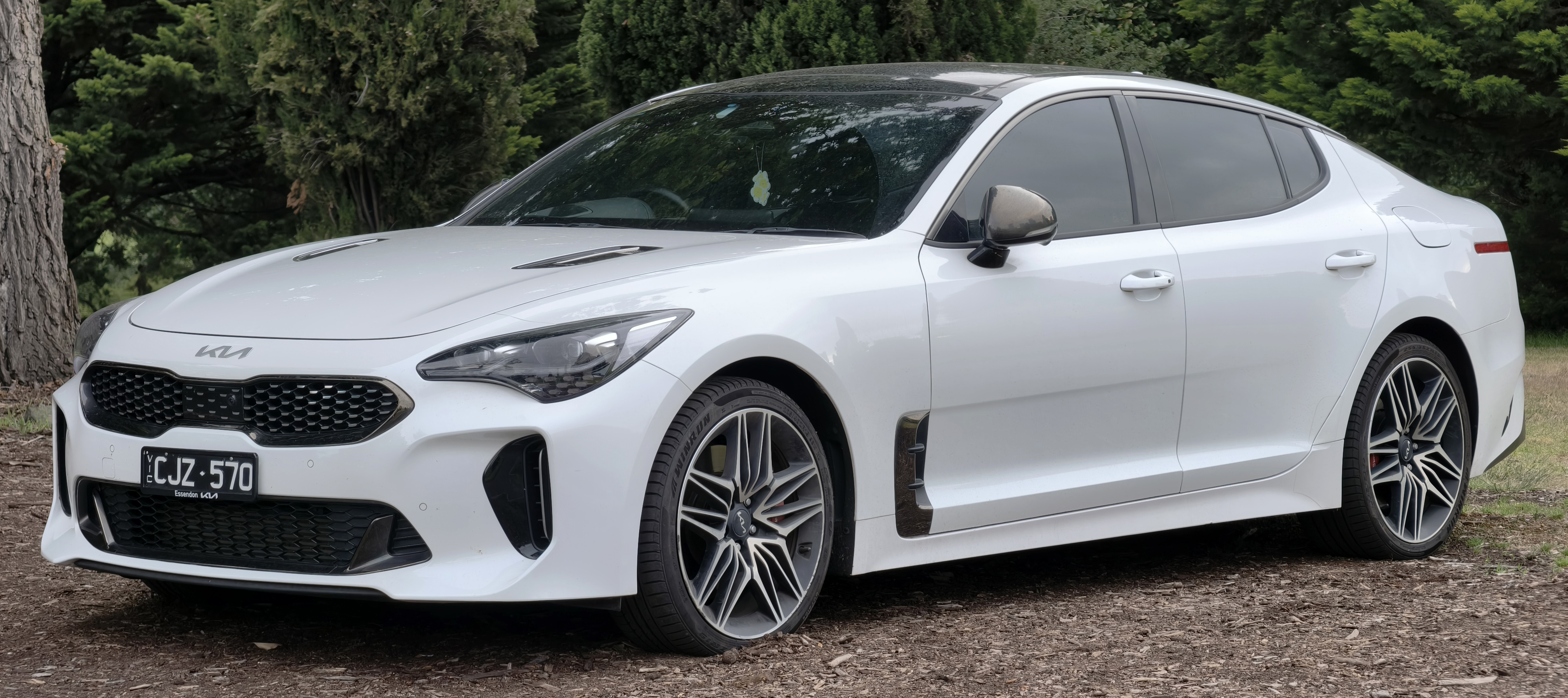

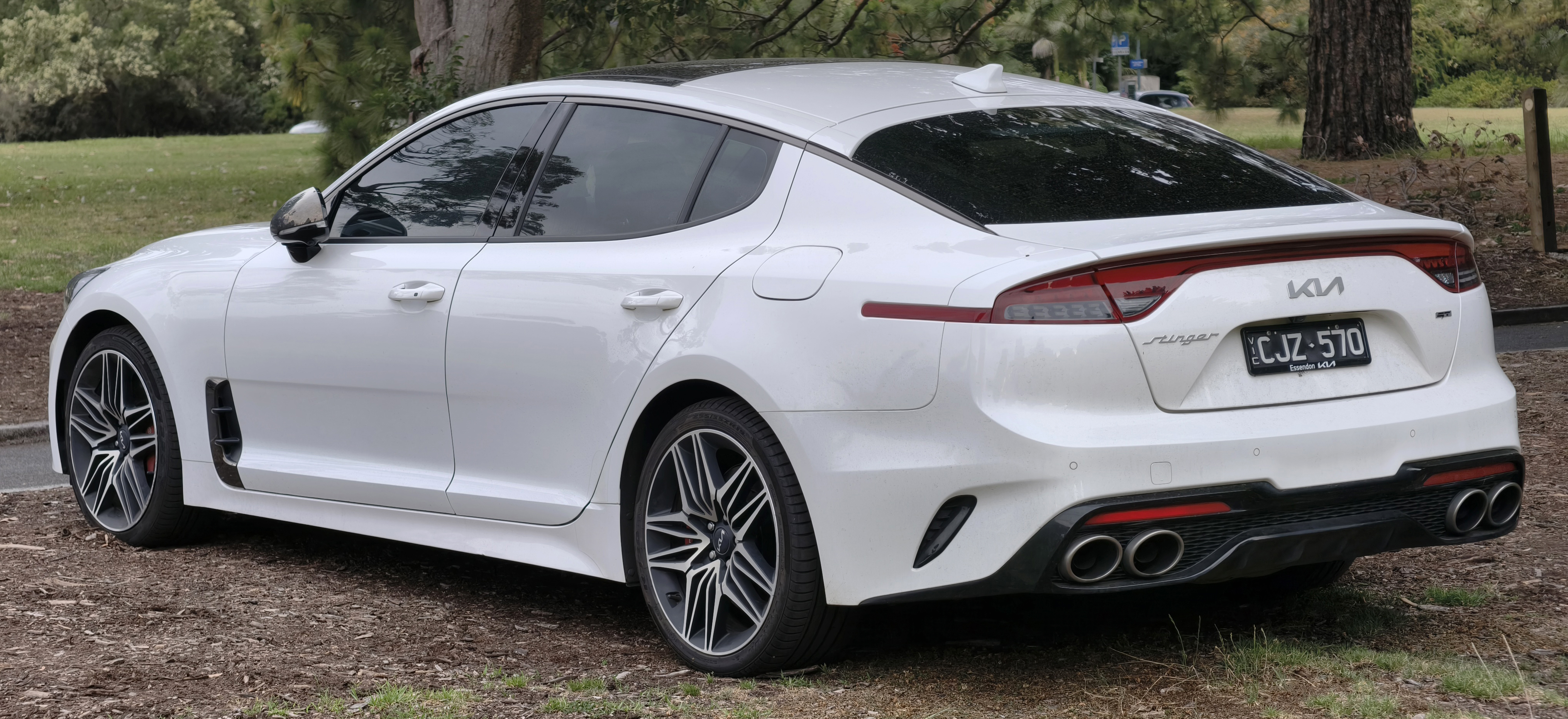
Facelift

In August 2020, Kia unveiled a refreshed Stinger that went on sale in South Korea on the third quarter of 2020 and worldwide by the end of year. Styling updates include revised headlights and tail lights, a new 10.25-inch infotainment screen and an additional wheel design. Kia also added an optional 2.5-liter Smartstream FR G2.5 T-GDi engine producing 304 PS (224 kW; 300 hp) as well as a variable exhaust to the existing 3.3-liter Lambda II RS T-GDi that increases the power by 3 PS (2.2 kW; 3.0 hp).

The Kia Stinger was updated for the British market on 6 January 2021, while the North American model was updated on 16 March 2021, making it one of the first cars to bear the new Kia logo in said region, alongside the Carnival. The Mexican model later arrived on 3 May 2021, also sporting the new Kia logo.

== Powertrain ==
Engines
| Model | Years | Transmission | Power | Torque | Acceleration 0–100 km/h (0-62 mph) (official) | Top Speed |
Gasoline
| Theta II 2.0 T-GDi | 2017–2023 | 8-speed automatic | 197 PS (145 kW; 194 hp) @ 6,200 rpm | 36 kg⋅m (353 N⋅m; 260 lbf⋅ft) @ 1,400–3,900 rpm | 8.0 s (RWD); 8.5 s (AWD) | 224 km/h (139 mph) |
| Theta II 2.0 T-GDi | 2017–2023 | 8-speed automatic | 255 PS (188 kW; 252 hp) @ 6,200 rpm | 36 kg⋅m (353 N⋅m; 260 lbf⋅ft) @ 1,400–4,000 rpm | 6.0 s (RWD); 6.8 s (AWD) | 240 km/h (149 mph) |
| Smartstream 2.5 T-GDi | 2020–2023 | 8-speed automatic | 304 PS (224 kW; 300 hp) @ 5,800 rpm | 43 kg⋅m (422 N⋅m; 311 lbf⋅ft) @ 1,650–4,000 rpm | 5.6 s (RWD) | |
| Lambda II 3.3 T-GDi | 2018–2020 | 8-speed automatic | 370 PS (272 kW; 365 hp) @ 6,000 rpm | 52 kg⋅m (510 N⋅m; 376 lbf⋅ft) @ 1,300–4,500 rpm | 4.6 s (RWD); 4.7–4.9 s (AWD) | 269 km/h (167 mph); 270 km/h (168 mph) |
| Lambda II 3.3 T-GDi | 2020–2023 | 8-speed automatic | 373 PS (274 kW; 368 hp) @ 6,000 rpm | 52 kg⋅m (510 N⋅m; 376 lbf⋅ft) @ 1,300–4,500 rpm | 4.6 s (RWD); 4.7–4.9 s (AWD) | 269 km/h (167 mph); 270 km/h (168 mph) |
Diesel
| R II 2.2 CRDi | 2018–2020 | 8-speed automatic | 202 PS (149 kW; 199 hp) @ 3,800 rpm | 45 kg⋅m (441 N⋅m; 325 lbf⋅ft) @ 1,750–2,750 rpm | 7.6 s (RWD) | 230 km/h (143 mph) |

== Marketing ==
In June 2017, Kia Motors teamed up with GQ magazine to promote the Stinger as a "street style icon".

The Stinger GT was featured in series 2 episode 3 of The Grand Tour, where co-presenter James May raced it against two longboard riders on a mountain road in Majorca, with the car going uphill and the skateboarders going downhill.

On 4 February 2018, Kia released two Stinger commercials during Super Bowl LII. The first commercial features racing driver Emerson Fittipaldi. The second features Aerosmith lead vocalist Steven Tyler driving the car on an oval track in reverse until he becomes 40 years younger.

In January 2019, Kia announced a partnership with K-pop girl group Blackpink to promote the Stinger, serving as the title sponsor for the group's In Your Area World Tour with Kia providing vehicles to support the group during the World Tour and featuring the Stinger alongside the group members in promotional videos.

In June 2021, the judges of America's Got Talent arrived to the show in two Kia Stinger GT2 2022.

== Safety ==
Euro NCAP

Euro NCAP test results for a LHD, 2.2-liter CRDi GT-Line 5-door fastback variant on a 2017 registration:

Euro NCAP test results* Kia Stinger (2017)
| Test | Points | % |
|---|---|---|
| Overall: | 5 /5 stars | |
| Adult occupant: | 35.4 | 93% |
| Child occupant: | 39.7 | 81% |
| Pedestrian: | 33.0 | 78% |
| Safety assist: | 9.9 | 82% |

ANCAP

ANCAP test results* Kia Stinger 200S and 330S variants (2017, aligned with Euro NCAP)
| Test | Points | % |
|---|---|---|
| Overall: | 3 /5 stars | |
| Adult occupant: | 31.9 | 84% |
| Child occupant: | 39.7 | 81% |
| Pedestrian: | 28.4 | 67% |
| Safety assist: | 3 | 25% |

ANCAP test results* Kia Stinger Si, EX, GT Line, GT Sport & GT variants (2017, aligned with Euro NCAP)
| Test | Points | % |
|---|---|---|
| Overall: | 5 /5 stars | |
| Adult occupant: | 34.9 | 91% |
| Child occupant: | 39.7 | 81% |
| Pedestrian: | 33 | 78% |
| Safety assist: | 8.4 | 70% |

ANCAP test results* Kia Stinger all variants (2017, aligned with Euro NCAP)
| Test | Points | % |
|---|---|---|
| Overall: | 5 /5 stars | |
| Adult occupant: | 34.9 | 91% |
| Child occupant: | 39.7 | 81% |
| Pedestrian: | 33 | 78% |
| Safety assist: | 8.4 | 70% |

== Police use ==
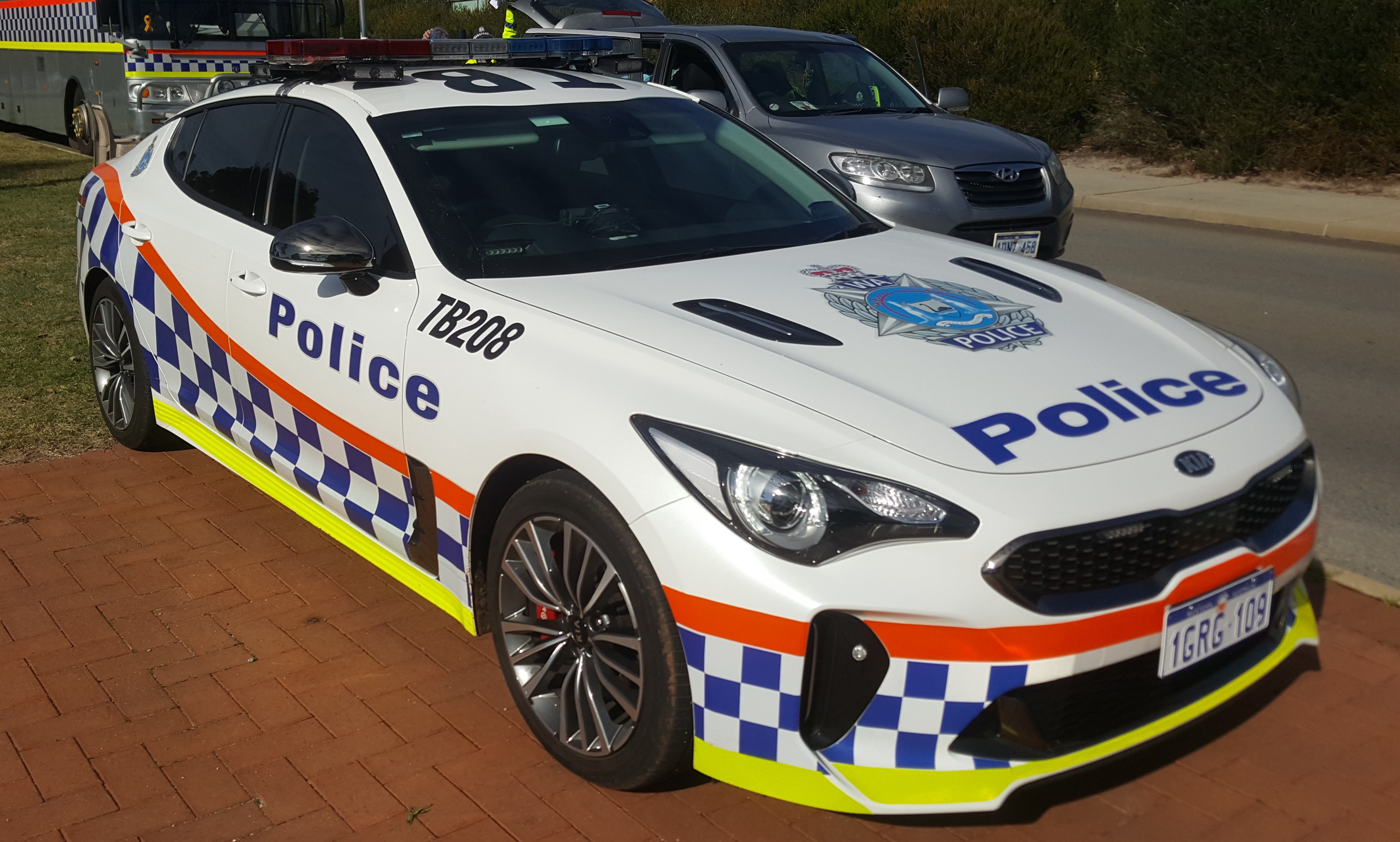
Western Australia Police Force 2018 Kia Stinger GT

In 2018, Queensland Police Service and Tasmania Police in Australia selected the Stinger 330S as their new Road Policing car, replacing the discontinued Ford Falcon and Holden Commodore police cars.

Since 2019, the V6 variants of the Stinger have been utilized by SPEED police units in Poland. The unmarked vehicles are used to monitor the safety on the roads; they are also used as pursuit vehicles.

In 2021, Merseyside Police started using the Stinger.

== Awards ==
The Stinger won the iF Product Design Award in the "Transportation Design" category and the Red Dot award in the "Best of the Best Car Design" category in 2018.

The Stinger won the 2018 MotorWeek Drivers' Choice Awards "Best of the Year".

== Discontinuation ==
In October 2022, Kia decided to end production of the Stinger in April 2023. The discontinuation was due to declining worldwide demand and its status as the lowest-selling Kia model, with only 1,499 units sold in its home country, as well as Kia's electrification strategy, which included plans for an electric coupe-type vehicle.

In December 2022, Kia released the Stinger Tribute Edition variant to mark the end of production, based on the Stinger GT 3.3-litre turbocharged petrol variant, it has an exclusive exterior color, interior upholstery and design specifications. The Tribute Edition variant is limited to 1,000 units worldwide; 200 units for Korea and 800 units worldwide. The exterior features the new Moonscape Gray matte color, and the 19" wheels and Brembo brakes are in black. For the interior, there are individual numbered door sills, Terracotta brown leather upholstery, faux carbon fibre trim on door panels and dashboard, the wasp icons embedded onto seat headrests.

== Sales ==
| Calendar year | South Korea | Mexico | United States | Canada | Europe | Australia | Other | Global |
|---|---|---|---|---|---|---|---|---|
| 2017 | 6,322 | 118 | 843 | 172 | 1,270 | 504 | 85 | 9,314 |
| 2018 | 5,700 | 521 | 16,806 | 1,682 | 5,723 | 1,957 | 952 | 33,341 |
| 2019 | 3,644 | 304 | 13,861 | 1,569 | 5,008 | 1,773 | 793 | 26,952 |
| 2020 | 3,525 | 143 | 12,556 | 1,125 | 2,177 | 1,778 | 490 | 21,794 |
| 2021 | 3,167 | 138 | 13,517 | 1,229 | 1,677 | 1,407 | 592 | 21,727 |
| 2022 | 1,984 | 77 | 7,809 | 688 | 1,147 | 2,242 | 1,287 | 15,234 |
| 2023 | 483 | 46 | 5,452 | 669 | 1,345 | 1,806 | 215 | 10,016 |
| 2024 | —N/a | —N/a | 1 | —N/a | 1 | —N/a | 12 | 14 |
| Total | 24,825 | 1,347 | 70,845 | 7,134 | 18,348 | 11,467 | 4,426 | 138,392 |
