= Panono =

Camera

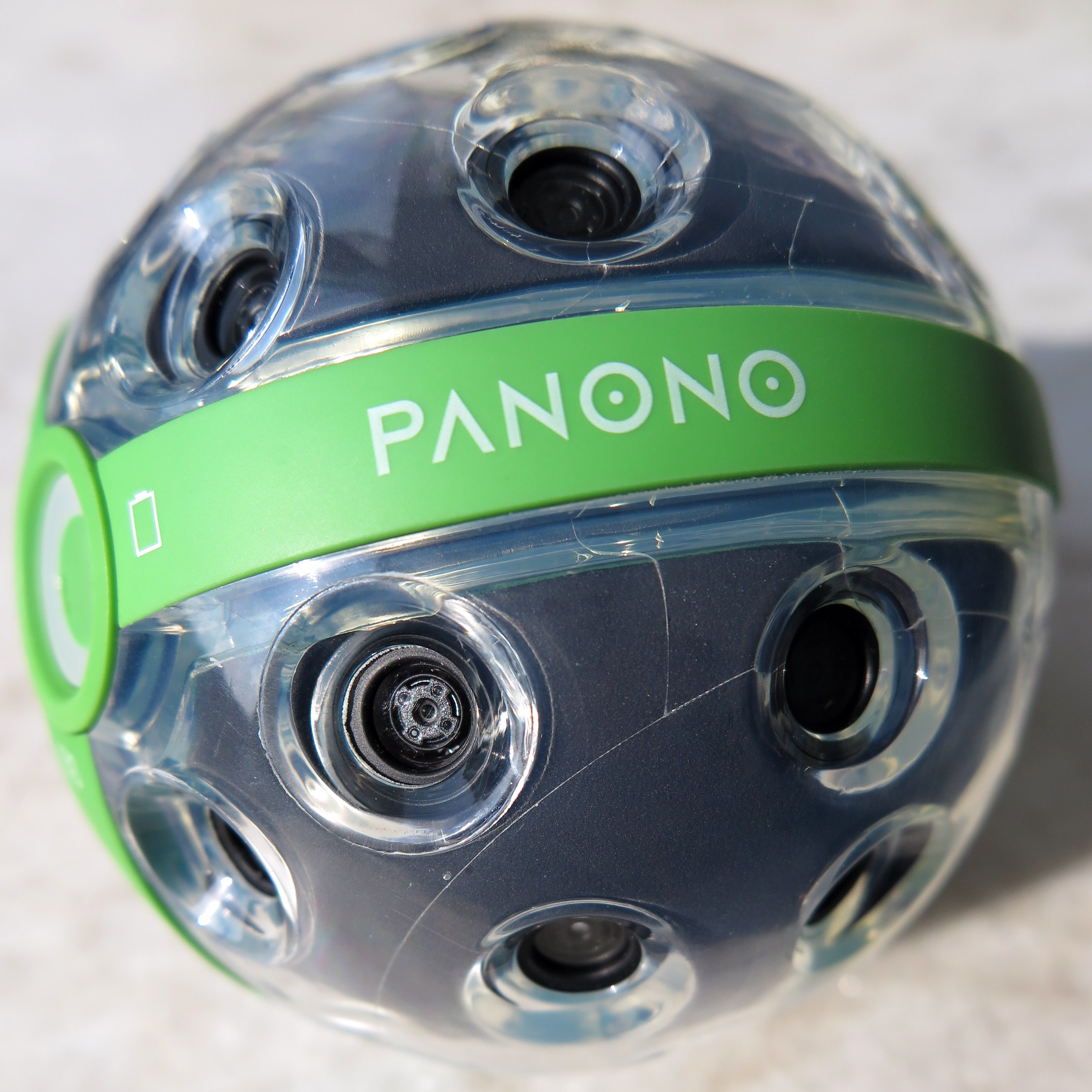
Spherical camera Panono

Panono is a 360° X 360° full-spherical, 108 megapixel Panoramic ball camera created by Berlin-based company Professional360 GmbH, previously knowns as Panono GmbH.

The Panono ball camera can be thrown into the air, and at its highest point the 36 cameras in the ball will shoot their respective portions of an airborne panoramic photo stitched together during later processing. Panono was able to collect 1,25 Million US$ through crowdfunding at indiegogo and over 1,6 Million € through crowdinvesting at companisto.

Panono raised approximately 1.25 million USD on Indiegogo and over 1.6 million EUR through crowd-investing on Companisto.

== Reviews ==
- "Best for photographers. If any photo is worth 1,000 words, Panono must be worth 10,000" - Wall Street Journal
- "The ball camera with an all-round view" according to the German WirtschaftsWoche.
- "The Panono is certainly a different kind of camera, but I can't wholeheartedly recommend it just yet. It's expensive and doesn't shoot video." - Mashable
- "The me from three years ago would have loved the hell out of the Panono. The me from 2016 is wishing for something more." - Gizmodo
- "Real world test: The Panono is a 108MP spherical camera" - dpreview.com

== Company insolvency and new investors ==
On 18 May 2017 Jonas Pfeil, co-founder and CEO of Panono GmbH, applied to the District Court of Charlottenburg for the opening of the insolvency proceedings.

Bryanston Group AG, a Swiss-based private equity investor, has acquired the assets, trademarks and patents of Panono GmbH and restarted its business operations under the new holding company Professional360 GmbH in Berlin. Professional360 GmbH will continue Panono's operations by offering the world's highest resolution 360-degree camera under the Panono brand.

After the company was unable to deliver the product to supporters, the company gave another opportunity for supporters of their original campaign to receive the 360-degree camera.
