= Deep Zoom =

Technology developed by Microsoft

- Developer: Microsoft
- Stable release: 0.9.000.5 / October 13, 2008; 17 years ago
- Operating system: Microsoft Windows (Media)
- Type: Multimedia
- License: Proprietary
- Website: msdn.microsoft.com/en-us/library/cc645050(VS.95).aspx

Deep Zoom is a technology developed by Microsoft for efficiently transmitting and viewing images. It allows users to pan around and zoom in on a large, high resolution image or a large collection of images. It reduces the time required for initial load by downloading only the region being viewed or only at the resolution it is displayed at. Subsequent regions are downloaded as the user pans to (or zooms into) them; animations are used to hide any jerkiness in the transition. The libraries are also available in other platforms including Java and Flash.

== History ==
The Deep Zoom file format is very similar to the Google Maps image format where images are broken into tiles and then displayed as required. The tiling typically follows a quadtree pattern of increasing resolution of image (in other words twice the zoom and twice the resolution). The main difference is that with Google Maps the actual details on the image change from one zoom level to another, while with Deep Zoom the same image is displayed at each zoom level.

Seadragon Software, formerly Sand Codex, first created the Seadragon technology and its implementation of what is now called Deep Zoom. This technology was then absorbed into the Microsoft Live Labs when Seadragon Software was acquired. Engineers from Seadragon now work with Microsoft to integrate their work into technology such as Silverlight and Photosynth.

== Deep Zoom examples ==
The most famous implementation of Deep Zoom was probably the first: the memorabilia collection at the Hard Rock website. Conceived and designed by Duncan/Channon and built by Vertigo, it was demonstrated for the first time in March 2008 at the Microsoft MIX convention in Las Vegas.

In 2010, Microsoft Live Labs partnered with the University of California, Berkeley to create ChronoZoom, a DeepZoom-powered time visualization tool that pushed the limits of DeepZoom, since it required zooming from the scale of 13 billion years down to a single day. The project has since graduated to development under Microsoft Research.

Another example is the Deep Earth project. It is described by its creators as "a community project focused on creating a rich interactive mapping control using Silverlight2 Deep Zoom. Concentrating on Microsoft Virtual Earth imagery and data the project offers team members the opportunity to learn and share while creating something cool and useful."

A paintings collection project http://galleryzoom.co.uk/ shows 1000 high resolution/sensor images individually indexed. (Using Deep Zoom Composer).

Blaise Aguera y Arcas gave a demonstration of Seadragon and Photosynth at the 2007 TED conference.

In November 2009, 352 Media Group, a Silverlight developer in the Microsoft Silverlight Partner Program, created an example of Deep Zoom using Microsoft Silverlight version 3. It is online at 352 Media Group's Web site.

The Winston Churchill Deep Zoom mosaic, created by Silverlight developers Shoothill, features as both an online interactive deep zoom and a standalone deep zoom which forms part of the Churchill exhibit in the Churchill War Rooms in Whitehall.

In 2010, Shoothill built the Sumatran Tiger Deep Zoom - the largest seen to date - for worldwide conservation charity Fauna and Flora International, featuring thousands of images of endangered species.

An early example of Deep Zoom-like technology was implemented at The Department of Maori Affairs in New Zealand in 1997. The technology was used to display Maori land ownership.

== Deep Zoom images ==
The file format used by Deep Zoom (as well as Photosynth and Seadragon Ajax) is XML based. Users can specify a single large image (dzi) or a collection of images (dzc). It also allows for "Sparse Images"; where some parts of the image have greater resolution than others, an example of which can be found on the Seadragon Ajax home page; The bike image displayed is a sparse image. Though used in the proprietary Deep Zoom, the dzi format is open and able to be used by anyone.

=== Deep Zoom image (dzi) ===
A DZI has two parts: a DZI file (with either a .dzi or .xml extension) and a subdirectory of image folders. Each folder in the image subdirectory is labeled with its level of resolution. Higher numbers correspond to a higher resolution level; inside each folder are the image tiles corresponding to that level of resolution, numbered consecutively in columns from top left to bottom right.

=== Deep Zoom collection (dzc) ===
A DZC is a collection of some number of DZIs linked and referenced by a DZC file (with either a .dzc or .xml extension). At a high level, a collection is a number of image thumbnails whose location is kept track of by the .dzc/.xml file, when zooming into an image, it accesses greater resolutions tiles. A DZC's structure is similar to that of a DZI; the .dzc/.xml file defines the collection and the subdirectory of folders maps to the DZI file structure, each with their set of .dzi/.xml and image tiles. The DZC is used in Microsoft's Pivot, but not in SeaDragon per se.

=== Sparse Images ===
Sparse images are a sub-classification of the DZI file type. A sparse image is normally a number of separate photographs with varying resolution levels that have been placed in a single DZI instead of a DZC. Sparse images have no different file structure than that of a DZI and differ only in that there is not a single "highest resolution" level for the entire DZI.

== Software that uses Deep Zoom ==
- Image Composite Editor - image stitching tool created by Microsoft Research
- Deep Zoom Composer - collage maker and simple panorama tool created by Microsoft. Images' resolution is maintained when exporting for web use (via Silverlight Deep Zoom or JavaScript using a third-party template). No longer available for download from Microsoft though it can be found on various other sources such as Internet Archive.

== iPhone OS development ==
Sea Dragon App Logo

Microsoft Live Labs has created an application for the App Store called Seadragon Mobile. It is run over the internet and includes Deep Zoom on the following categories; art, history, maps, photos, Photosynth which anybody can upload to, space and technology & web.
