= Image Composite Editor =

Advanced panoramic image stitcher

- Screenshot of Microsoft Image Composite Editor v1.3.5 on Windows 7 stitching an 88 megapixel panorama of a valley
- Developer: Microsoft
- Stable release: 2.0.3 / February 25, 2015
- Operating system: Windows XP (only up to version 1.4.4), Windows Vista, Windows 7, Windows 8.1
- Type: Image stitching
- License: Freeware
- Website: microsoft.com/en-us/research/project/image-composite-editor/

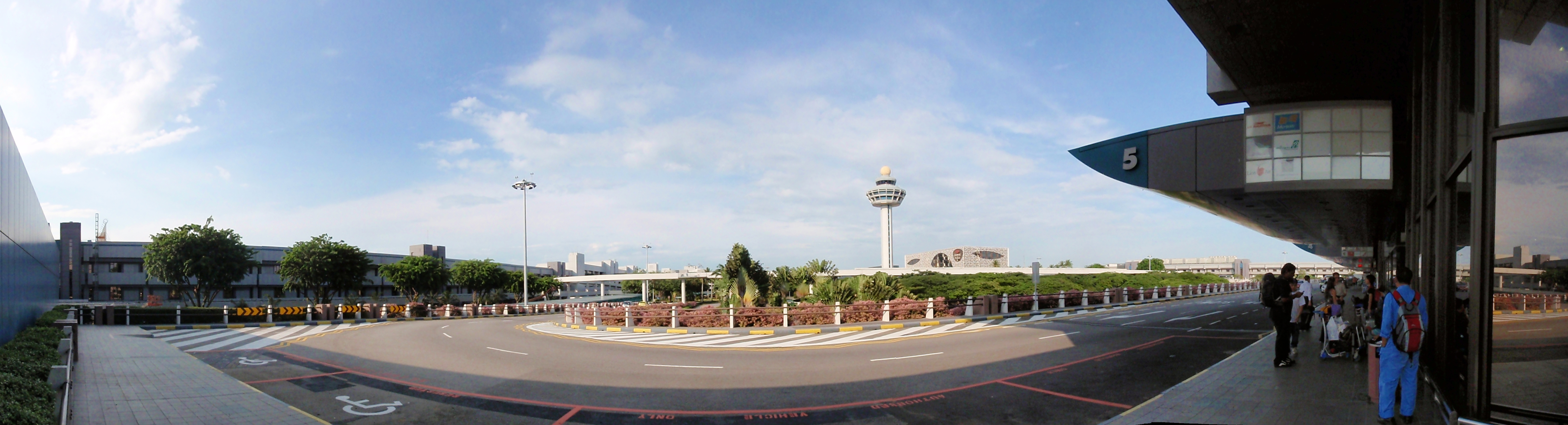
Panoramic view of Changi Airport Terminal 1 - Gate 5 created using Microsoft Image Composite Editor

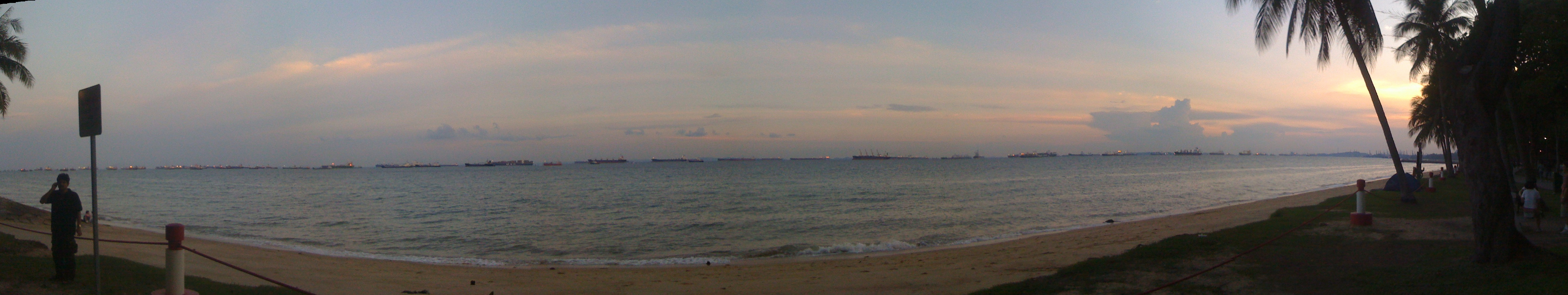
Panoramic View of East Coast Park, Singapore created using Microsoft Image Composite Editor

Image Composite Editor was an advanced panoramic image stitcher made by the Microsoft Research division of Microsoft Corporation.

== Overview ==
The application took a set of overlapping photographs of a scene shot from a single camera location and created a high-resolution panorama incorporating all the source images at full resolution. The stitched panorama could be saved in a wide variety of file formats, from common formats like JPEG and TIFF to multi-resolution tiled formats like HD View and Deep Zoom, as well as allowing multi-resolution upload to the (now defunct) Microsoft Photosynth site. Uploads could also be saved to a web page with a zoomable viewer using a third-party template.

In 2021 the Image Composite Editor project was retired and the software was no longer available for download from Microsoft though it can be found on various other sources such as Internet Archive.

== Features ==
- Stitching algorithms automatically place source images and determine panorama type
- Advanced orientation adjustment view allows planar, cylindrical, and spherical projections
- Support for different types of camera motion
- Panorama stitching from video
- Automatic lens vignette removal
- Automatic cropping to maximum image area
- Optional automatic completion of missing image parts (helpful for sky, clouds, grass, gravel etc.)
- No image size limitation – stitch Gigapixel images
- Constrained assembly of image sets taken on a known regular grid, e.g. with a Gigapan head
- Native support for 64-bit operating systems
- Support for exporting the results to HD View, Deep Zoom, TIFF, JPEG, PNG and layered Photoshop file formats
- Panorama publishing to Microsoft Photosynth

However, Microsoft ICE did not provide any anti-ghosting mechanism, like other panorama stitching programmes do, e.g. the open source programme Hugin (software) and various commercial applications.

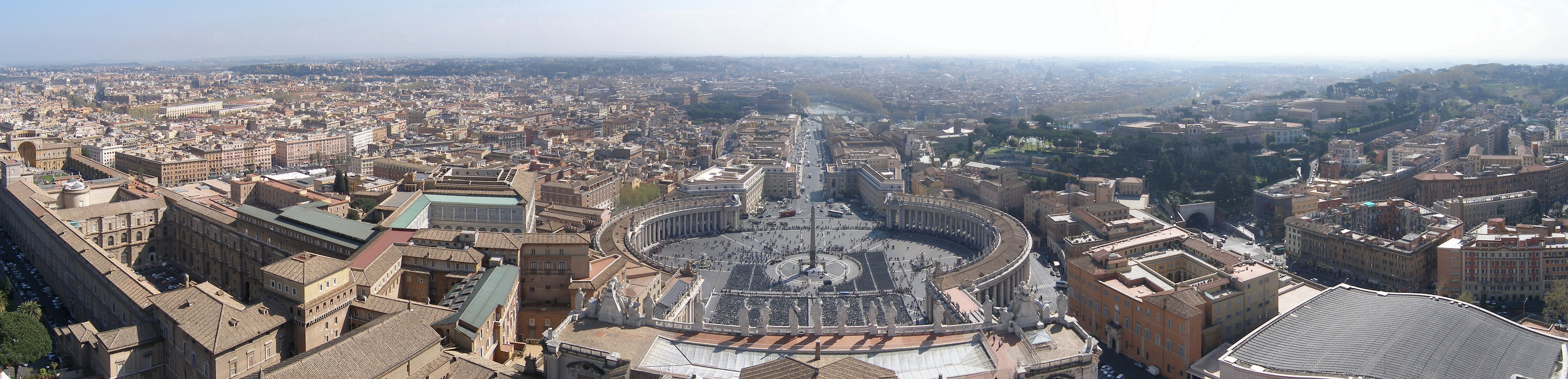
View of Rome from the Dome of St. Peter's Basilica. Taken with an Olympus Camedia C-7070 Wide Zoom, stitched using Microsoft Research Image Composite Editor v1.4.4.

== See also ==
- Microsoft Research
- Windows Live Photo Gallery
