= Dhirubhai Ambani Green Energy Giga Complex =

Renewable energy manufacturing complex

- Built: First Phase: 2021–2024 (planned); Second Phase: 2024–2026 (planned)
- Location: Jamnagar, India
- Coordinates: 22°22′37.02″N 69°54′14.03″E
- Industry: Renewable energy
- Products: Lithium-ion batteries; Solar panels; Powerwall; Megapack
- Area: Land: 7.8125 sq mi (20.234 km^{2}; 5,000.0 acres)
- Owner: Reliance Industries
- Website: www.ril.com/OurBusinesses/New-Energy.aspx

The Dhirubhai Ambani Green Energy Giga Complex (also known as Jamnagar Green Energy Giga Complex) is a mega project being developed by Reliance Industries in Jamnagar, Gujarat, India. This is a fully integrated renewable energy manufacturing complex that will build gigafactories for photovoltaic panels, energy storage, green hydrogen, electrolyzers and fuel cells systems. The complex is being built on a 5,000 acres (20 km^{2}; 7.8 sq mi) site and is expected to cost ₹75,000 crores (US$10 billion). The first phase of the project, which includes the construction of a 20 GW solar photovoltaic module factory, is expected to be completed by 2023, 5 GWh annual cell to pack manufacturing facility by 2024, and further scale up to 50 GWh & 100 GWh annual capacity by 2027 & 2030.

In 2021, Mukesh Ambani announced as part of the annual company report that Reliance has begun construction on the Dhirubhai Ambani Green Energy Giga Complex.

== See also ==
- Jamnagar Refinery
