= David Amodio =

American scientist

David Amodio is an American scientist who examines the psychological and neural mechanisms underlying social behavior, with a focus on self-regulation and intergroup relations. Amodio is known for his role in developing the field of social neuroscience and for his neuroscientific approach to social psychology.

Amodio's research considers the roles of social cognition, emotion, and motivation, and their neural underpinnings, as they relate to implicit processes and mechanisms of control in social behaviors. His research has revealed that social motivations and attitudes can shape the earliest stages of face processing in vision.

In a complementary line of work, Amodio investigates the effects of discrimination on health and decision making among targets of prejudice, with the broad goal of understanding and reducing health disparities.

Amodio is also the author of an influential review of the brain's role in social cognition, and he has received attention for his study showing that political liberals and conservatives differ in patterns of brain activity associated with cognitive control—an early example of research in the field of political neuroscience.

Although his questions often address classic social psychological issues, Amodio's approach is interdisciplinary; he integrates theory and methodology from social psychology, cognitive and affective neuroscience, and psychophysiology to inform his hypotheses and the designs of his studies.

Amodio directs the New York University Social Neuroscience Laboratory and the NYU Social Neuroscience Network, and he serves as associate editor for the Journal of Personality and Social Psychology. He was also a co-founder of the Social and Affective Neuroscience Society and served on the founding advisory board for the Society for Social Neuroscience.

Amodio has been recognized for his research contributions with awards such as the Presidential Early Career Award for Scientists and Engineers (PECASE) from the White House, the Janet T. Spence Award for Transformative Early Career Contributions from the Association for Psychological Science, the F. J. McGuigan Early Career Investigator Prize from the American Psychological Foundation, the Early Career Award for Contribution to Social Cognition from the International Social Cognition Network, and the SAGE Young Scholars Award from the Foundation for Personality and Social Psychology.
