= Blaise Agüera y Arcas =

American software engineer (born 1975)

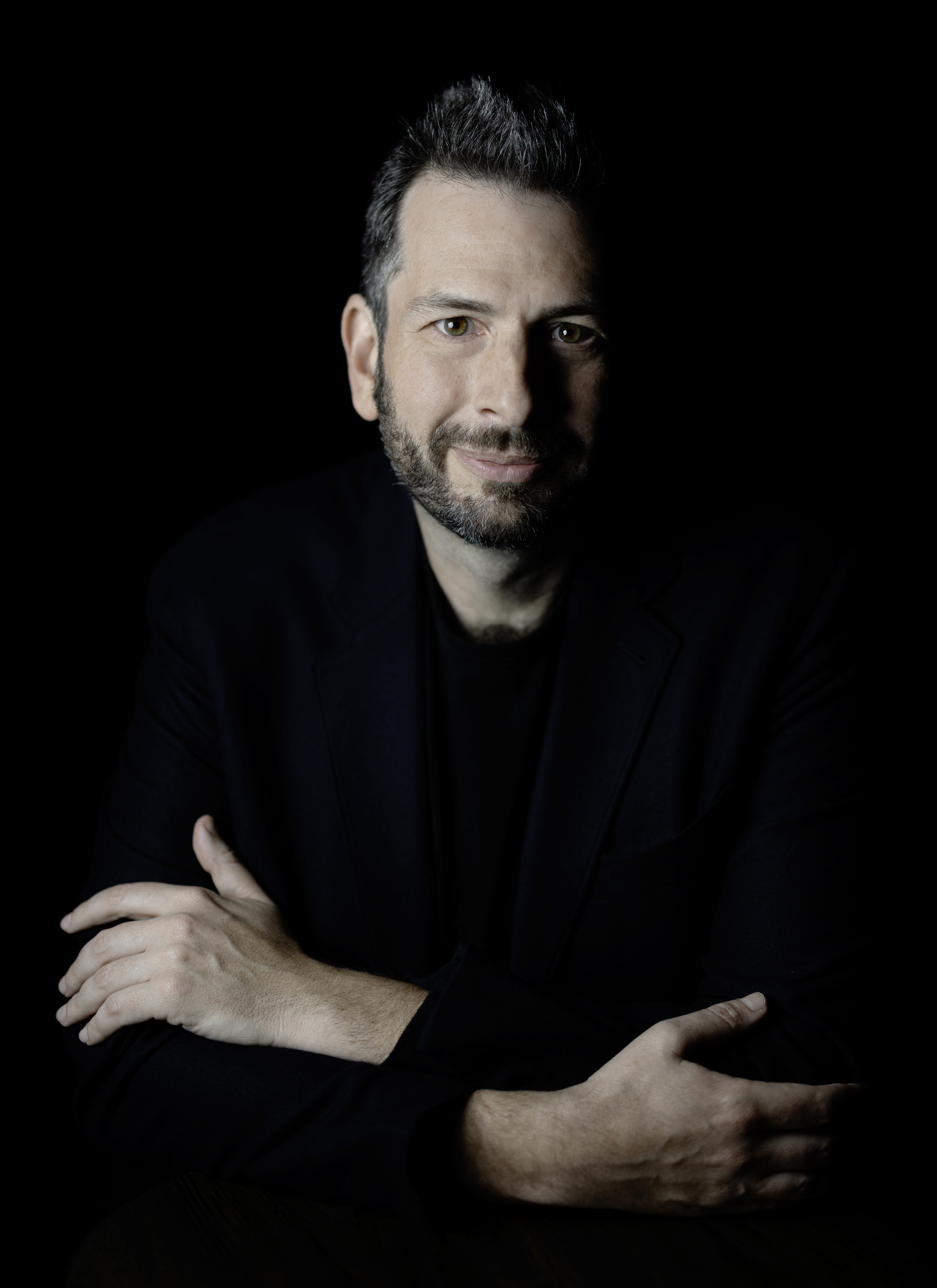
- Blaise Agüera y Arcas in 2025
- Born: 28 August 1975 (age 51); Providence, Rhode Island
- Education: Princeton University
- Occupations: AI researcher, software engineer, author
- Employer: Google
- Website: blaiseaguera.com

Blaise Agüera y Arcas (born August 28, 1975) is an American artificial intelligence (AI) researcher, software engineer, software architect, and author.

He is a vice president, fellow, and the CTO of Technology & Society at Google, where he leads the Paradigms of Intelligence team on basic research in AI and related fields. He is known for his work developing on-device machine learning and for inventing federated learning.

In 2016, he founded the Artists and Machine Intelligence program at Google, which creates art by pairing machine intelligence engineers with artists. Before he joined Google in 2013, Agüera y Arcas was an engineer at Microsoft and the architect of Bing Maps and Bing Mobile.

Agüera y Arcas has published scientific articles, essays, op-eds, and has given TED Talks. He wrote the books Ubi Sunt in 2022, Who Are We Now? in 2023, and What Is Life? and What Is Intelligence? in 2025.

== Early life and education ==
Blaise Agüera y Arcas was born in Providence, Rhode Island to a Spanish father and an American mother. He grew up in Mexico City. As a teenager, Agüera y Arcas interned with the U.S. Navy research center in Bethesda, Maryland, where he reprogrammed the guidance software for aircraft carriers to improve their stability at sea, which helped to reduce seasickness among sailors. In 1998 Agüera y Arcas graduated from Princeton University where he received a B.A. in physics.

== Career ==
In 2001, using computational techniques, Agüera y Arcas and Princeton University’s Scheide Librarian Paul Needham published their findings that the punchcutting method for mass-producing movable type attributed to Johannes Gutenberg was likely invented decades after Gutenberg's Bible, and by a different inventor.

=== Seadragon ===
In 2003, Agüera y Arcas founded Sand Codex, later renamed Seadragon Software. He moved to Seattle in 2004 to accommodate his wife's new role at the University of Washington. In 2004, he devised a computational method for the Library of Congress to create color composite images of almost two thousand negatives by Sergey Prokudin-Gorsky.

=== Microsoft ===
In 2006, Agüera y Arcas sold Seadragon to Microsoft Live Labs. The technology was used to develop Silverlight, Pivot, Photosynth and the standalone cross-platform Seadragon application for iPhone and iPad. Slate called Photosynth "the best thing to happen to digital photography since the digital camera".

At Microsoft, Agüera y Arcas was the architect leading Bing Maps and Bing Mobile and was named a Distinguished Engineer in 2011. He collaborated with Ricoh to make the Theta, a 360° camera whose captured content displayed in Photosynth.

=== Google ===
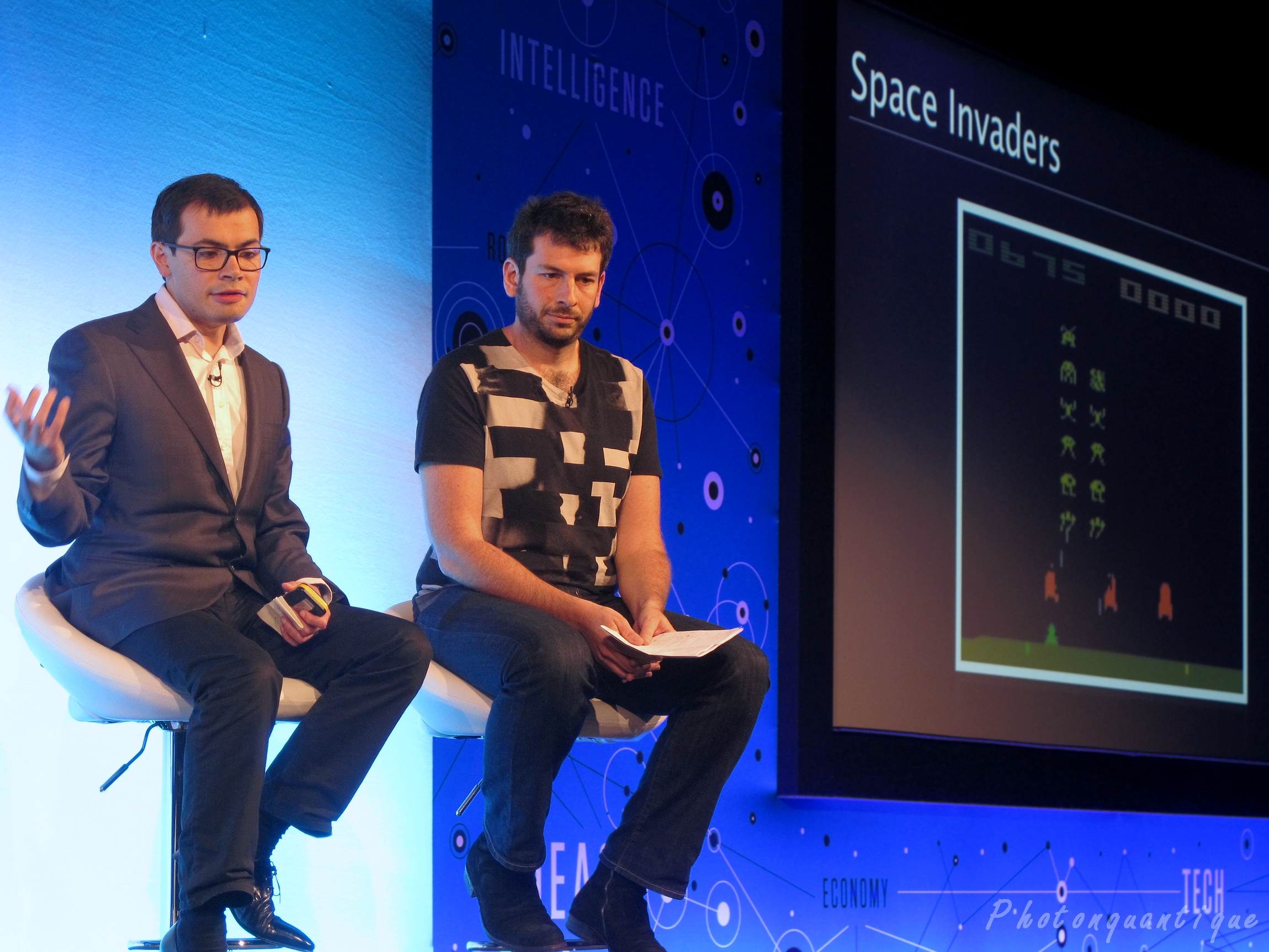
Blaise Agüera y Arcas (right) with Demis Hassabis (left) in 2014, at the Wired conference in London

In 2013, Agüera y Arcas left Microsoft to lead a new machine intelligence effort at Google, along with programs in computer vision and computational photography. His departure from Microsoft for Google generated press interest, with articles appearing in publications that included The New York Times, Fast Company, International Business Times, and ValueWalk.

At Google, Agüera y Arcas contributed to developments in on-device machine learning for Android and Pixel, and led the invention of Federated Learning, an approach to training neural networks in a distributed setting that protects user privacy by eliminating the need to share personal data.

In 2016, he founded the Artists and Machine Intelligence program, which fuses machine intelligence and art. The program's first public exhibit was on February 26, 2016 at the Gray Area, where Agüera y Arcas was the keynote speaker. On June 1, 2016, the program held the MAMI (Music, Art, and Machine Intelligence) show.

In 2021, Agüera y Arcas published an opinion on his experience with the latest generation large language models in the form of AI chatbot LaMDA stating that "no objective answer is possible to the question of when an 'it' becomes a 'who'."

In 2024, Agüera y Arcas and his Paradigms of Intelligence team, with The University of Chicago, published research on the emergence of self-replicating programs in computational environments, contributing to advancements in the fields of Origins of Life and Artificial Life.

In 2025, Agüera y Arcas was appointed to the External Faculty at the Santa Fe Institute, a selective group of researchers advancing complex-systems science.

== Publications ==
=== Books ===
- Aguera y Arcas, Blaise (2022-10-25). Ubi Sunt. Hat & Beard, LLC. ISBN 978-1-95-512513-0. online version
- Aguera y Arcas, Blaise (2023-12-19). Who Are We Now?. Hat & Beard, LLC. ISBN 978-1-955125-30-7. online version
- Aguera y Arcas, Blaise (2025-03-11). What Is Life?: Evolution as Computation. MIT Press. ISBN 978-0-262-55409-1.
- Aguera y Arcas, Blaise (2025-09-23). What Is Intelligence?: Lessons from AI About Evolution, Computing, and Minds. MIT Press. ISBN 978-0-262-04995-5. online version

=== Essays and op-eds ===
- “Art in the Age of Machine Intelligence”, Medium, February 2016.
- “Physiognomy's New Clothes”, (co-authored with Margaret Mitchell, Alexander Todorov), Medium, May 2017.
- “Do algorithms reveal sexual orientation or just expose our stereotypes?”, (co-authored with Margaret Mitchell, Alexander Todorov), Medium, January 2018.
- “Do large language models understand us?”, Medium, December 2021.
- “The Illusion Of AI's Existential Risk”, (co-authored with Blake Richards, Guillaume Lajoie, Dhanya Sridhar), Noema Magazine, July 2023.
- “Artificial General Intelligence Is Already Here”, (co-authored with Peter Norvig), Noema Magazine, October 2023.
- “Our attitudes towards AI reveal how we really feel about human intelligence”, The Guardian, July 2024.
- “In the Beginning, There Was Computation”, Nautilus, August 2024.
- “AI Is Evolving — And Changing Our Understanding Of Intelligence”, (co-authored with James Manyika), Noema Magazine, April 2025.
- “Life, Intelligence, and Consciousness: A Functional Perspective”, Long Now, August 2025.
- “Is Life a Form of Computation?”, The MIT Press Reader, September 2025.
- “Consciousness Across Three Worldviews”, (co-authored with Swami Sarvapriyananda, Carlo Rovelli), Noema Magazine, September 2025.
- “What is the future of intelligence? The answer could lie in the story of its evolution”, Nature, November 2025.

=== TED Talks ===
Date	Title	Comments
5/2007	How PhotoSynth Can Connect the World's Images	Demonstrates Seadragon's zooming technology and Photosynth's ability to create 3D models from user photos. Named one of Bill Gates's "13 favorite talks".
2/2010	Augmented Reality Maps	Live demo of live video in Bing Maps.
5/2016	How Computers are Learning to be Creative	How computers can be used to generate images; refers to DeepDream.
3/2024	What Data Says About Your Identity Politics	The future of human identity.
6/2025	The Intelligence of Us: Rethinking Minds in the Age of AI	How artificial and natural minds are intertwined.

== Honors and awards ==
In 2008, Agüera y Arcas was named one of MIT Technology Review's Innovators Under 35 TR35.

Fast Company has named Agüera y Arcas one of the "Most Creative People in Business" in 2009 and in 2014.

Agüera y Arcas' books Ubi Sunt (2022) and Who Are We Now? (2023) were both recognized with AIGA's 50 Books | 50 Covers award. Who Are We Now? also received Tokyo TDC's RGB Prize in 2025.
