= Reliance Industries =

Indian multinational conglomerate

Reliance Industries Limited
- Formerly: Reliance Commercial Corporation (1958–1966); Reliance Textiles and Engineers (1966–1973)
- Type: Public
- Traded as: BSE: 500325; NSE: RELIANCE; LSE: RIGD; BSE SENSEX constituent; NSE NIFTY 50 constituent
- ISIN: INE002A01018
- Industry: Conglomerate
- Founded: 1958; 68 years ago
- Founder: Dhirubhai Ambani
- Headquarters: Mumbai, Maharashtra, India
- Area served: Worldwide
- Key people: Mukesh Ambani (Chairman & Managing Director)
- Products: Petroleum; Natural gas; Petrochemicals; Textiles
- Services: Retail; Telecommunications; Media and entertainment; Digital services
- Revenue: ▲₹11.04 lakh crore (US$110 billion) (2026)
- Operating income: ▲₹2.07 lakh crore (US$21 billion) (2026)
- Net income: ▲₹95,754 crore (US$9.9 billion) (2026)
- Total assets: ▲₹21.78 lakh crore (US$230 billion) (2026)
- Total equity: ▲₹10.85 lakh crore (US$110 billion) (2026)
- Owner: Ambani family (50%)
- Number of employees: 419,911 (2026)
- Subsidiaries: List: Jio Platforms (67.03%) Reliance Retail Jio-bp (51%) JioStar (16.34%) Network18 Group (56.89%) DEN Networks (78.62%) Hathway (71.95%) Alok Industries (75%) Reliance Foundation Indiawin Sports Relicord Reliance Institute of Life Sciences Reliance Industrial Infrastructure (45.43%) Sterling and Wilson Renewable Energy Reliance New Energy Ltd. Sikka Ports & Terminals Limited Renewable Energy Corporation
- Website: www.ril.com
- Footnotes; Financials as of 31 March 2026

Reliance Industries Limited is an Indian multinational conglomerate headquartered in Mumbai. Its businesses include energy, petrochemicals, natural gas, retail, entertainment, telecommunications, mass media, and textiles. Reliance is the largest public company in India by market capitalisation and revenue, and the 88th largest company worldwide. It is India's largest private tax payer and largest exporter, accounting for 7% of India's total merchandise exports.

The company has attracted controversy for reports of political corruption, cronyism, fraud, financial manipulation, and exploitation of its customers, Indian citizens, and natural resources.

== History ==
=== 1958–1985 ===
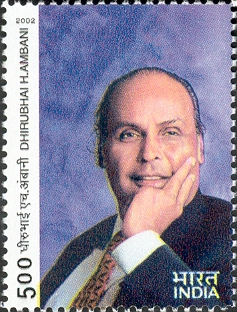
Stamp released in 2002 to honor company founder Dhirubhai Ambani

Reliance Commercial Corporation was set up in 1958 by Dhirubhai Ambani as a small venture firm trading commodities, especially spices and polyester yarn. In 1965, the partnership ended and Dhirubhai continued the polyester business of the firm. In 1966, Reliance Textiles Industries Pvt. Ltd. was incorporated in Maharashtra. It established a synthetic fabrics mill in the same year at Naroda in Gujarat. On 8 May 1973, it became Reliance Textiles Industries Limited. In 1975, the company expanded its business into textiles, with "Vimal" becoming its major brand in later years. The company held its initial public offering (IPO) in 1977. The issue was over-subscribed by seven times. In 1979, a textiles company Sidhpur Mills was amalgamated with the company. In 1980, the company expanded its polyester yarn business by setting up a Polyester Filament Yarn Plant in Patalganga, Raigad, Maharashtra with financial and technical collaboration with E. I. du Pont de Nemours & Co., U.S.

=== 1981–2000 ===
In 1985, the name of the company was changed from Reliance Textiles Industries Ltd. to Reliance Industries Ltd. During 1985 to 1992, the company expanded its installed capacity for producing polyester yarn by over 145,000 tonnes per annum.

The Hazira petrochemical plant was commissioned in 1991–92.

In 1993, Reliance turned to the overseas capital markets for funds through a global depository issue of Reliance Petroleum. In 1996, it became the first private sector company in India to be rated by international credit rating agencies. S&P rated Reliance "BB+, stable outlook, constrained by the sovereign ceiling". Moody's rated "Baa3, Investment grade, constrained by the sovereign ceiling".

In 1995/96, the company entered the telecommunications industry through a joint venture with NYNEX, USA, and promoted Reliance Telecom Private Limited in India.

In 1998, Reliance took over Indian Petrochemicals Corporation Limited during privatization of public sector enterprises.

In 1998/99, RIL introduced packaged LPG cylinders under the brand name Reliance Gas.

The years 1998–2000 saw the construction of the integrated petrochemical complex at Jamnagar in Gujarat, the largest refinery in the world.

=== 2001 onwards ===
In 2001, Reliance Industries Ltd. and Reliance Petroleum Ltd. became India's two largest companies in terms of all major financial parameters. In 2001–02, Reliance Petroleum was merged with Reliance Industries.

In 2002, Reliance announced India's biggest gas discovery (at the Krishna Godavari basin) in nearly three decades and one of the largest gas discoveries in the world during 2002. The in-place volume of natural gas was more than 7 trillion cubic feet, equivalent to about 120 crore (1.2 billion) barrels of crude oil. This was the first-ever discovery by an Indian private sector company.

In 2002–03, RIL purchased a majority stake in Indian Petrochemicals Corporation Ltd. (IPCL), India's second largest petrochemicals company, from the government of India, RIL took over IPCL's Vadodara Plants and renamed it as Vadodara Manufacturing Division (VMD). IPCL's Nagothane and Dahej manufacturing complexes came under RIL when IPCL was merged with RIL in 2008.

In 2005 and 2006, the company reorganised its business by demerging its investments in power generation and distribution, financial services and telecommunication services into four separate entities.

In 2006, Reliance entered the organised retail market in India with the launch of its retail store format under the brand name of 'Reliance Fresh'. By the end of 2008, Reliance Retail had close to 600 stores across 57 cities in India.

In November 2009, Reliance Industries issued 1:1 bonus shares to its shareholders.

In 2010, Reliance entered the broadband services market with acquisition of Infotel Broadband Services Limited, which was the only successful bidder for pan-India fourth-generation (4G) spectrum auction held by the government of India. In the same year, Reliance and BP announced a partnership in the oil and gas business. BP took a 30 per cent stake in 23 oil and gas production sharing contracts that Reliance operates in India, including the KG-D6 block for $7.2 billion. Reliance also formed a 50:50 joint venture with BP for sourcing and marketing of gas in India.

In 2017, RIL set up a joint venture with Russian Company Sibur for setting up a Butyl rubber plant in Jamnagar, Gujarat, to be operational by 2018.

In 2018, the Commercial Court (England and Wales), hearing a legal case involving Reliance Industries and the Union of India, ruled for the first time that the foreign act of state doctrine applied when issues were being addressed through arbitration, as well as when they are addressed through litigation.

In August 2019, Reliance added Fynd primarily for its consumer businesses and mobile phone services in the e-commerce space.

In December 2022, Reliance Industries Market cap stood at ₹17.59 lakh crore (US$223.78 billion).

In the field of generative pre-trained transformer (GPT) technology, Reliance Industries Ltd. and The BharatGPT Group announced in February 2024 that they would launch a large language model (LLM), Hanuman's AI system, in March 2024. The model will work in 11 local languages in four major areas: health, governance, financial services and education.

In February 2024, Reliance and The Walt Disney Company announced a deal to merge their streaming and television assets. The deal was closed in November 2024, with the Disney Star joint venture having a reported value of $8.5 billion.

In October 2024, Reliance entered into an agreement with Nvidia to procure Blackwell chips for its planned data centre in Jamnagar.

On 14 August 2026, Reliance Industries and Rolls-Royce announced their strategic intent for a partnership to develop and manufacture an indigenous aero engine for the Advanced Medium Combat Aircraft (AMCA). A dedicated Aero Gas Turbine Complex will be established in India. The facility will support the programme by serving as a centre of excellence for power and propulsion technology where the design, development, manufacturing, testing, production and through-life support of the programme will be undertaken. This is a parallel proposal to the Safran–GTRE programme.

== Shareholding ==
The number of shares of RIL are approx. 644.51 crore (6.44 billion). The promoter group, the Ambani family, holds 50.39% of the total shares whereas the remaining 49.61% shares are held by public shareholders, including FII and corporate bodies. Life Insurance Corporation of India, public sector company, is the largest non-promoter investor in the company, with 6.49% shareholding.

In January 2012, the company announced a buyback program to buy a maximum of 12 crore (120 million) shares for ₹10,400 crore (US$1.95 billion). By the end of January 2013, the company had bought back 4.62 crore (46.2 million) shares for ₹3,366 crore (US$574.42 million).

=== Listing ===
The company's equity shares are listed on the National Stock Exchange of India Limited (NSE) and the BSE Limited. The Global Depository Receipts (GDRs) issued by the company are listed on London Stock Exchange. It has issued approx. 5.6 crore (56 million) GDRs wherein each GDR is equivalent to two equity shares of the company. Approximately 3.46% of its total shares are listed on Luxembourg Stock Exchange.

Its debt securities are listed at the Wholesale Debt Market (WDM) Segment of the National Stock Exchange of India Limited (NSE).

It has received domestic credit ratings of AAA from CRISIL (S&P subsidiary) and Fitch. Moody's and S&P have provided investment grade ratings for international debt of the company, as Baa2 positive outlook (local currency issuer rating) and BBB+ outlook respectively.

On 28 December 2017, RIL announced that it will be acquiring the wireless assets of Anil Ambani-led Reliance Communications for about ₹23,000 crores.

== Operations ==
The company's petrochemical, refining, and oil and gas-related operations form the core of its business; other divisions of the company include cloth, retail, telecommunications, and special economic zone (SEZ) development.

Revenue by segment (2024)
Segment	Share of revenue
Oil to Chemicals	53.12%
Retail	26.68%
Digital Services	11.05%
Others	6.77%
Oil and Gas	2.38%

In July 2012, RIL informed that it was going to invest US$1 billion over the next few years in its new aerospace division which will design, develop and manufacture equipment and components, including aircraft, engine, radars, avionics and accessories for military and civilian aircraft, helicopters, unmanned airborne vehicles, and aerostats.

In July 2024, Reliance Industries was granted the approval by United States to resume importing oil from Venezuela.

The company had more than 200 subsidiary companies and more than 15 associate companies as of 2024. In fiscal year 2024, the company generated 65% of its sales in India and 35% outside India.

=== Financials ===
Year	2010	2011	2012	2013	2014	2015	2016	2017	2018	2019	2020
Revenue (₹ cr)	2,00,400	2,58,651	3,39,792	3,71,119	4,01,302	3,88,494	2,96,091	3,30,180	4,30,731	6,25,212	6,59,205
Profit after tax (₹ cr)	16,236	20,286	20,040	21,003	21,984	23,566	27,630	29,901	34,993	39,837	44,324
Year	2021	2022	2023	2024	2025						
Revenue (₹ cr)	5,39,238	7,88,743	9,74,864	10,00,122	10,71,174						
Profit after tax (₹ cr)	53,739	66,184	73,670	79,020	81,309						

== Subsidiaries ==
=== Jio Platforms ===
Jio Platforms Limited, essentially a technology company, is a majority-owned subsidiary of RIL. It has a valuation of more than US$100 billion on expert view as of October 2022. It is the result of a corporate restructuring announced in October 2019, resulting in all the digital initiatives and the telecommunication assets being housed under this new subsidiary. This new subsidiary holds all the digital business assets including Reliance Jio Infocomm Ltd, which in turn holds the Jio connectivity business - mobile, broadband and enterprise, and also the other digital assets (Jio Apps, Tech backbone and Investments in other tech entities like Haptic, Hathway and Den Networks among others). In April 2020, RIL announced a strategic investment of ₹43,574 crore (US$5.88 billion) by Facebook into Jio Platforms. This investment translated into a 9.99% equity stake, on a fully diluted basis. Further in May 2020, RIL sold roughly 1.15% stake in Jio Platforms for ₹5,656 crore (US$763.3 million) to the American private equity investor, Silver Lake Partners. Intel became the 12th company to invest in Reliance Jio platforms after it invested ₹1,894.50 crore ($250 million), the total investments in Jio platforms is ₹117,588.45 crore so far. On 16 July 2020, Google announced that it will acquire a 7.7% stake in Jio Platforms for ₹33,737 crore (US$5.02 billion). Mukesh Ambani has named his son, Akash Mukesh Ambani as the chairperson of Jio in 2022.

=== Reliance Retail ===
Reliance Retail is the retail business wing of the Reliance Industries. In April 2025, it had 19,340 stores in India, across formats.

It is the largest retailer in India. Many brands like Reliance Fresh, Reliance Footprint, Reliance Time Out, Reliance Digital, Reliance Wellness, Reliance Trends, Reliance Autozone, Reliance Super, Reliance Mart, Reliance iStore, Reliance Home Kitchens, Reliance Market (Cash n Carry) and Reliance Jewel come under the Reliance Retail brand. Its annual revenue for the financial year 2012–13 was ₹108 billion (US$1.1 billion) with an EBITDA of ₹780 million (US$8.1 million). Its market value is more than $60 billion. Mukesh Ambani stepped down from the position of chairperson of Reliance Retail and handed over the job to his daughter Isha Ambani Piramal. Ambani announced it during the 45th Reliance AGM, in 2022. As per reports, this act is a part of Ambani's leadership transition.

=== Reliance Industrial Infrastructure ===
Reliance Industrial Infrastructure Limited (RIIL) is an associate company of RIL. It was incorporated in September 1988 as Chembur Patalganga Pipelines Limited, with the main objective being to build and operate cross-country pipelines for transporting petroleum products. The company's name was subsequently changed to CPPL Limited in September 1992, and thereafter to its present name, Reliance Industrial Infrastructure Limited, in March 1994. RIIL is mainly engaged in the business of setting up and operating industrial infrastructure. The company is also engaged in related activities involving leasing and providing services connected with computer software and data processing.

=== Network18 Group ===
Between 2011 and 2014, Reliance acquired majority stake in Network18 Group. Through Network18, Reliance owns multiple news channels including CNN-News18 and News18 India.

Network 18 is a mass media company. It has interests in television, digital platforms, publication, mobile apps and films. It also operates two joint ventures, namely Viacom18 and History TV18 with Viacom and A+E Networks respectively. It has also acquired a partial part of ETV Network and since renamed its channels under the Colors TV brand.

=== Indiawin Sports Pvt.Ltd. ===
Indiawin Sports Pvt. Ltd. is a 100% subsidiary that owns the Mumbai Indians men's and women's professional T20 franchise cricket teams, playing in the IPL and WPL respectively. Besides, they also own various teams across different leagues globally such as the MI Cape Town, MI Emirates, MI New York and MI London teams in the SA20, ILT20, the MLC and The Hundred leagues respectively.

=== Other ===
- Reliance Global Corporate Security is a private security company founded on 17 August 1998. It provides enterprise wide security to assets of Reliance Industries. It is composed of former member of the military and paramilitary forces, law enforcement agencies, intelligence services as well as technical experts from other industries.
- Reliance Life Sciences works around medical, plant and industrial biotechnology opportunities. It specialises in manufacturing, branding, and marketing Reliance Industries' products in bio-pharmaceuticals, pharmaceuticals, clinical research services, regenerative medicine, molecular medicine, novel therapeutics, biofuels, plant biotechnology, and industrial biotechnology sectors of the medical business industry.
- Embibe a Bengaluru-based EdTech start-up raised funding of ₹89.91 crores from RIL in February 2020. Over three years, Reliance Industries had invested around $180 million in the start-up. A part of it was towards acquiring a stake of 72.69% from Embibe's existing investors. In December 2019, Embibe, under the proprietary name (Individual Learning Private Limited), announced that it picked up equity shares in Bengaluru-based K12 startup Funtoot (eDreams Edusoft). The deal was capped at ₹71.64 crores in cash, which holds 90.5% of the equity share capital of Funtoot. In February 2020, it acquired the rival platform OnlineTyari.
- Reliance Logistics is a company selling transportation, distribution, warehousing, logistics, and supply chain-related products. Reliance Logistics is an asset based company with its own fleet and infrastructure. It provides logistics services to Reliance group companies and outsiders.
- Reliance Solar, the solar energy subsidiary of Reliance, was established to produce and retail solar energy systems primarily to remote and rural areas. It offers a range of products based on solar energy: solar lanterns, home lighting systems, street lighting systems, water purification systems, refrigeration systems and solar air conditioners. In 2022 RIL AGM, Mukesh Ambani specified that his youngest son Anant Ambani will take over the new energy business.
- Reliance Eros Productions LLP, joint venture with Eros International to produce film content in India.
- Reliance Industrial Investments and Holdings Limited (RIIHL), a wholly owned subsidiary of RIL which provides financial services. The Company owns securities of companies other than banks, as well as offers investment services. RIIHL bought majority stakes in two companies - logistics firm Grab A Grub Services Private Limited and software company C-Square Info Solutions - for over ₹146 crores in March 2019. RIIHL also sponsored the Tower Investment trust (InvITs) for the acquisition of 49% equity in RJio's tower assets for ₹25,215 crores by the Canadian asset management firm Brookfield Infrastructure Partners. On 22 April 2021, RIIHL acquired the entire issued share capital of Stoke Park Ltd, company that owns and manages sporting and leisure facilities in Stoke Poges, Buckinghamshire for £57 million.
- Reliance Strategic Business Ventures Limited (RSBVL), a wholly owned subsidiary of RIL bought a 51.78% stake in robotics and AI firm Asteria Aerospace for ₹23.12 crore and an 85% stake in NowFloats Technologies for ₹141.63 crores in Dec 2019. It also holds 18.83% in EIH Limited, the flagship company of The Oberoi Group, one of the largest luxury hotel chains in India. In November 2019, RSBVL invested an undisclosed amount in SkyTran Inc. for 12.7%, increased it further to 26.3% by April 2020. In February 2021, RIL became the majority stakeholder with 54.46% with an additional investment of $26.76 million.
- Reliance Sibur is a joint venture between Reliance Industries and Silbur in the business of making synthetic rubber.
- Relicord is a cord blood banking service owned by Reliance Life Sciences. It was established in 2002. It has been inspected and accredited by AABB, and also has been accorded a licence by Food and Drug Administration (FDA), Government of India.
- Reliance Institute of Life Sciences (RILS), established by Dhirubhai Ambani Foundation, is an institution offering higher education in various fields of life sciences and related technologies.
- Reliance Clinical Research Services (RCRS), a contract research organisation (CRO) and wholly owned subsidiary of Reliance Life Sciences, specialises in the clinical research services industry. Its clients are primarily pharmaceutical, biotechnology and medical device companies.
- LYF, a 4G-enabled VoLTE device brand from Reliance Retail.
- In 2026, Mukesh Ambani's Reliance Industries faced challenges from both the U.S. and China. Following pressure from the U.S. to cease purchasing Russian oil, Reliance shifted its strategy. However, Ambani's new concern emerged as China imposed restrictions on technology transfers. Reliance's plans to produce lithium-ion cells were hindered after Chinese company Xiamen Hithium withdrew from a licensing deal. These restrictions could impact India's electric vehicle (EV) and renewable energy sectors, stifling growth in both industries.

=== Former holdings ===
In March 2017, Reliance Industries Ltd (RIL) completed the sale process of its 76% equity stake in Mauritius-based oil retailer Gulf Africa Petroleum Corp (GAPCO) to Total Marketing & Services, a subsidiary of the French oil and gas firm Total SE.

The East West Pipeline has been acquired by India Infrastructure Trust, which is owned by Brookfield Asset Management, for a consideration of $1.56 billion USD (₹13,000 crore).

== Criticism and controversies ==
The company has attracted controversy for reports of political corruption, cronyism, fraud, financial manipulation, and exploitation of its customers, Indian citizens, and natural resources.

=== ONGC litigation ===
In May 2014, ONGC complained to the Delhi High Court accusing RIL of pilferage of 18 billion cubic metres of gas from its gas-producing block in the Krishna Godavari basin. Subsequently, the two companies agreed to form an independent expert panel to probe any pilferage.

=== Cronyism ===
Seminar magazine (2003) detailed Reliance founder Dhirubhai Ambani's proximity to politicians, his enmity with Bombay Dyeing's Nusli Wadia, the exposes by the Indian Express and Arun Shourie about illegal imports by the company and overseas share transactions by shell companies, and the botched attempt to acquire Larsen & Toubro.

As early as 1996, Outlook magazine addressed other controversies related to fake and switched shares; insider trading; and a nexus with the state-owned Unit Trust of India. Five main allegations concerning Reliance, which have plunged the Indian capital markets into a period of uncertainty unsurpassed since the days of the securities scam were:

- Reliance issued fake shares.
- It switched shares sent for transfer by buyers to make illegal profits.
- It indulged in insider trading in shares.
- It established a nexus with the Unit Trust of India to raise huge sums of money to the detriment of UTI subscribers.
- It attempted to monopolize the private telecom services market through front companies.

=== 2005 Criminal investigation ===
The Central Bureau of Investigation (CBI) filed a charge sheet in a Mumbai court against Reliance Industries Limited (RIL) and four retired employees of National Insurance Company Limited (NICL), including a former CMD, under provisions of the Prevention of Corruption Act for criminal conspiracy and other charges. Acting on a reference from CVC in March 2005, the CBI started probing the conspiracy that led to the filing of the charge sheet on 9 December 2011. The 2005 complaint had alleged irregularities in the issuance of insurance policies — for coverage of default payments — by NICL to RIL. The charge sheet also mentioned criminal offenses with dishonest intention and causing wrongful loss totaling ₹147.41 crores to NICL and wrongful gain to the private telecom provider.

Two retired senior officials of National Insurance Company Limited and 11 others were awarded varying jail terms by a Delhi court in Jan 2014.

=== RIL plane grounded ===
A business jet owned by Reliance Industries (RIL) was grounded by The Directorate General of Civil Aviation (DGCA) on 22 March 2014 during a surprise inspection, for carrying expired safety equipment on board; its pilot was also suspended for flying without a license.

=== Krishna Godavari (KG) Basin gas controversy ===
Reliance Industries Limited (RIL) was supposed to relinquish 25% of the total area outside the discoveries in 2004 and 2005, as per the Production Sharing Contract (PSC). However, the entire block was declared as a discovery area and RIL was allowed to retain it. In 2011, the Comptroller and Auditor General of India (CAG) criticized the Oil Ministry for this decision. The CAG also faulted RIL for limiting the competition in contracts, stating that RIL awarded a $1.1 billion contract to Aker on a single-bid basis.

=== Petition against Reliance Jio ===
A PIL filed in the Supreme Court by an NGO Centre for Public Interest Litigation, through Prashant Bhushan, challenged the grant of a pan-India license to RJIL by the Government of India. The PIL alleged that RJIL was allowed to provide voice telephony along with its 4G data service, by paying an additional fee of just INR 16,580 million (US$280 million) which was arbitrary and unreasonable and contributed to a loss of INR 228,420 million (US$3.8 billion) to the exchequer.

The CAG in its draft report alleged rigging of the auction mechanism, whereby an unknown ISP, Infotech Broadband Services Pvt Ltd, acquired the spectrum by bidding 5000 times its net worth, after which the company was sold to Reliance Industries.

=== Future Retail deal and possession ===
In February 2022, Reliance terminated the leases of hundreds of Future Retail locations, the next largest retail chain in India, and took possession of those brick-and-mortar shops. Future Retail had a deal to sell its assets to Reliance, but that deal was contested by Amazon.com, which in 2019 acquired a stake in a subunit of Future Retail along with certain rights with respect to the transfer of the retailer's assets. Reliance's possessions came after rounds of legal wrangling, including a 2020 arbitration in Singapore and an antitrust review by the Competition Commission of India.

=== Stock manipulation and penalty ===
For manipulating shares of Reliance Petroleum Limited (RPL), Reliance Industries was fined Rs. 950 crore (about 447 crore in retracted gains and 500 crore in interest) in 2007. In April 2006, RPL went public as a Reliance subsidiary at a price of Rs. 60 per share. The market crashed by 30% after it floated at roughly Rs. 100, and RPL was back at 60. In accordance with Securities and Exchange Board of India directive, RIL carried out an organised operation with the help of its agents in order to obtain unauthorised profits from the trading of its formerly listed unit, RPL, which was combined with the former in 2009.

=== Reliance's business ties with Russia ===
Reliance Industries has faced criticism for maintaining business relations with Russia despite international sanctions imposed following Russia's invasion of Ukraine in 2022. The company has engaged in energy deals with Russian oil giant Rosneft, raising concerns about its alignment with global efforts to reduce economic ties with Russia. Reliance has been listed on Leave Russia, a platform tracking companies still active in the Russian market, further intensifying scrutiny over its role in facilitating Russian energy exports. In December 2024, Reliance Industries entered into a contract with Rosneft to procure 500,000 barrels of oil per day for 10 years. This corresponds to around US$13 billion per year.

== Reliance demerger and family feud ==
The Ambani family holds around 45% of the shares in RIL. Since its inception, the company was managed by its founder and chairman Dhirubhai Ambani. After suffering a stroke in 1986, he handed over the daily operations of the company to his sons Mukesh Ambani and Anil Ambani. After the death of Dhirubhai Ambani in 2002, the management of the company was taken up by both the brothers. In November 2004, Mukesh Ambani, in an interview, admitted to having differences with his brother Anil over 'ownership issues'. He also said that the differences "are in the private domain". The share prices of RIL were impacted by some margin when this news broke out. In 2005, after a bitter public feud between the brothers over the control of the Reliance empire, mother Kokilaben intervened to broker a deal splitting the RIL group business into two parts. In October 2005, the split of Reliance Group was formalised. Mukesh Ambani got Reliance Industries and IPCL. Younger brother Anil Ambani received telecom, power, entertainment, and financial services business of the group. The Anil Dhirubhai Ambani Group includes Reliance Communications, Reliance Infrastructure, Reliance Capital, Reliance Natural Resources and Reliance Power.

The division of Reliance group business between the two brothers also resulted in de-merger of 4 businesses from RIL. These businesses immediately became part of Anil Dhirubhai Ambani Group. The existing shareholders in RIL, both the promoter group and non-promoters, received shares in the de-merged companies.

== Awards and recognition ==
- International Refiner of the year in 2017 at Global Refining and Petrochemicals Congress 2017
- International Refiner of the Year in 2013 at the HART Energy's 27th World Refining & Fuel Conference. This is the second time that RIL has received this Award for its Jamnagar Refinery, the first being in 2005.
- The Brand Trust Report ranked Reliance Industries as the 7th most trusted brand in India in 2013 and 9th in 2014.
- RIL was certified as 'Responsible Care Company' by the American Chemistry Council in March 2012.
- RIL was ranked at 25th position across the world, on the basis of sales, in the ICIS Top 100 Chemicals Companies list in 2012.
- RIL was awarded the National Golden Peacock Award 2011 for its contribution in the field of corporate sustainability.
- In 2009, Boston Consulting Group (BCG) named Reliance Industries as the world's fifth biggest 'sustainable value creator' in a list of 25 top companies globally in terms of investor returns over a decade.
- The company was selected as one of the world's 100 best managed companies for the year 2000 by IndustryWeek magazine.
- From 1994 to 1997, the company won National Energy Conservation Award in the petrochemical sector.

== See also ==
- List of companies of India
- Dhirubhai Ambani Green Energy Giga Complex
- Reliance Group
- Dhirubhai Ambani
