= Photosynth =

Discontinued app and service

Microsoft Photosynth

- Photosynth technology showing Spider Meadows in Central Washington
- Developer: Microsoft
- Release: August 20, 2008; 17 years ago
- Final release: 2.110.317.1042 / March 18, 2010; 16 years ago
- Type: 3D modeling, panorama stitching
- Website: photosynth.net

Photosynth is a discontinued app and service from Microsoft Live Labs and the University of Washington that analyzes digital photographs and generates a three-dimensional model of the photos and a point cloud of a photographed object. Pattern recognition components compare portions of images to create points, which are then compared to convert the image into a model. Users are able to view and generate their own models using a software tool available for download at the Photosynth website.

== History ==
Photosynth is based on Photo Tourism, a research project by University of Washington graduate student Noah Snavely. Shortly after Microsoft's acquisition of Seadragon in early 2006, that team began work on Photosynth, under the direction of Seadragon founder Blaise Agüera y Arcas.

Microsoft released a free tech preview version on November 9, 2006. Users could view models generated by Microsoft or the BBC, but not create their own models at that time. Microsoft teamed up with NASA on August 6, 2007, allowing users to preview its Photosynth technology showing the Space Shuttle Endeavour. On August 20, 2007, a preview showing the tiles of Endeavour during the backflip process was made available for viewing.

On August 20, 2008, Microsoft officially released Photosynth to the public, allowing users to upload their images and generate their own Photosynth models.

In March 2010, Photosynth added support for gigapixel panoramas stitched in Microsoft ICE. The panoramas use Seadragon based technology similar to the system already used in synths.

In July 2015, Microsoft announced it would be retiring the Photosynth mobile apps. As Photosynth prepared to shut down in early 2017, Mapillary, a crowdsourced street-level imaging platform, reached out to the Photosynth community with their Photosynth-to-Mapillary blog post, and the official Photosynth Twitter account suggested users "check them out". On February 6, 2017, Microsoft decommissioned the Photosynth website and services.

On December 20, 2017, Photosynth returned as a feature of the Microsoft Pix app.

In the development of Microsoft Flight Simulator, Microsoft's Photosynth technology returned to recreate buildings and terrain across the entire world.

== Process ==
In March 2010, Photosynth added the ability to upload Panoramas. Here, the edge of a panorama of a valley can be seen.

The Photosynth technology works in two steps. The first step involves the analysis of multiple photographs taken of the same area. Each photograph is processed using an interest point detection and matching algorithm developed by Microsoft Research which is similar in function to UBC's Scale-invariant feature transform. This process identifies specific features, for example the corner of a window frame or a door handle. Features in one photograph are then compared to and matched with the same features in the other photographs. Thus photographs of the same areas are identified. By analyzing the position of matching features within each photograph, the program can identify which photographs belong on which side of others. By analyzing subtle differences in the relationships between the features (angle, distance, etc.), the program identifies the 3D position of each feature, as well as the position and angle at which each photograph was taken. This process is known scientifically as bundle adjustment and is commonly used in the field of photogrammetry, with similar products available such as Imodeller and D-Sculptor. This first step is extremely computationally intensive, but only has to be performed once on each set of photographs.

The second step involves the display of and navigation through the 3D point cloud of features identified in the first step. This is done with the publicly downloadable Photosynth viewer. The viewer resides on a client computer and maintains a connection to a server that stores the original photographs. It enables a user to, among other things, see any of the photographs from their original vantage point. It incorporates DeepZoom technology Microsoft obtained through its acquisition of Seadragon in January 2006. The Seadragon technology enables smooth zooming into the high-resolution photographs without downloading them to the user's machine.

The Photosynth Direct 3D-based viewing software is only available to the Windows 7, Windows Vista and Windows XP operating systems. However, the team released a Silverlight version of the viewer which has succeeded the D3D viewer as the main option to view photosynths.

== Mobile apps ==
As of March 2009, user uploaded Photosynth collections were available for viewing on iPhones using iSynth (3D) or Seadragon Mobile (2D only). The Photosynth application was also available from the App Store to download on iPod Touch and iPhone. In May 2012, Microsoft released a Photosynth App for its mobile platform, Windows Phone. On July 10, 2015, Microsoft announced that they are retiring the Photosynth Mobile Apps, removing them from their stores, and are no longer supporting or updating them.

While the Photosynth platform was shut down in early 2017, its features re-appeared in the fall within the Microsoft Pix app for iOS, however as of late 2020, the Photosynth features appear to no longer be part of the Microsoft Pix app.

== Capabilities ==
Photographs taken by any regular digital camera or mobile phone could be uploaded to Photosynth. Users had the option to geotag their digital shots on sites such as Flickr and then upload them to the online Photosynth web service. Images uploaded on Photosynth gave people the ability to view landmarks, public spaces and objects from all sides.

- Walk or fly through a scene to see photos from any angle
- Zoom in or out of a photo
- See where pictures were taken in relation to one another
- Smoothly change viewing angle between nearby photos
- Smoothly zoom in and out of high-resolution photos
- Find similar photos to the one you're currently viewing

== In the media ==
- On April 30, 2008, Photosynth was featured in the episode Admissions of the television show CSI: New York.
- CNN utilized Photosynth for a user-contributed 3D vision of the inauguration of Barack Obama as the President of the United States.
- In the Angels & Demons "Path of Illumination Contest," Photosynth is used as well as advertised in the website.
- In the MSN's coverage of the 70th anniversary of the RAF victory in the Battle of Britain, a Photosynth hangar of some of the fighter planes from the battle was built. A series of Photosynths have also been created for the Imperial War Museum Duxford so that web users could experience the planes up close from a range of angles.

== See also ==
- Microsoft Image Composite Editor — a free advanced panorama stitching system
- Seadragon Software
- Hugin (software) — a cross-platform open source panorama stitching system
- QuickTime VR
- MeshLab — a cross-platform open source mesh processing tool that allows to import point clouds reconstructed by Photosynth
- Guassian Splatting — photorealistic 3d scenes rendered from a sparse set of 2D images
