= Relicord =

Indian blood bank service

- Founded: 2001; 25 years ago As Relicord
- Headquarters: Dhirubhai Ambani Life Sciences Centre (DALC), Navi Mumbai, INDIA
- Key people: Mukesh Ambani
- Website: http://www.relicord.com/

Relicord is an initiative by the Reliance Industries in the field of biotechnological advancement. It is established as a part of the subsidiary of Reliance Industries, Reliance Life Sciences.

== About Relicord ==
ReliCord has already stored over 3,500 cord blood samples at its repository. It conforms to the AABB and USFDA guidelines and has an infrastructure to collect cord blood from any corner of the country through its collection centres. ReliCord offers public as well as private banking and is the only facility in India that offers stem cell research for current and future applications. The cord blood samples are stored at the Dhirubhai Ambani Life Sciences Centre (DALC) campus in Navi Mumbai. The repository is completely automated and uses the most advanced technology under the supervision of a host of experienced scientists.

In 2002 Reliance Industries Limited has established blood banking service under Relicord.

== Social view ==
ReliCord runs three programs for the collection of cord blood: ReliCord S, ReliCord A and ReliCord M. ReliCord S and ReliCord A offer stem cell enriched cord blood repository services as well as stem cell enriched cord blood for transplantation to address haematological disorders. ReliCord S is a program for sibling donors. This program is for a mother or a family that wants to process and bank the umbilical cord blood stem cells from the present pregnancy. Only family members waiting for transplantation can utilize this program. Under ReliCord S the stored cord blood stem cells can be used for haematopoetic stem cell transplantation for family members suffering from diseases such as thalassemia or leukemia. The ReliCord S and A program not only stores the stem cells but also tests and processes the same along with delivering the stem cells to the transplant site as per the direction received from the transplant physician.
