= Hazira Manufacturing Division =

Manufacturing plant of Reliance Industries Limited in Gujarat, India

- Location within India
- Built: 1991-92
- Location: Hazira, Gujarat, India
- Coordinates: 21.169938°N 72.673938°E
- Industry: Petrochemical
- Products: petrochemicals - Ethylene, Propylene, Benzene, Xylene; polymers - VCM-PVC, Polyethylene, Polypropylene; polyesters - POY(Partially oriented yarn), PSF(Polyester-staple fiber), PET, Polyester Fiberfill, Polyester Filament Yarn (PFY); Synthetic rubber - SBR, PBR; polyester intermediates - Purified Terephthalic Acid, Mono Ethylene Glycol
- Area: 700 acres
- Owner: Reliance Industries Limited

Hazira Manufacturing Division (HMD) is the manufactory of Reliance Industries Limited (RIL) located at Hazira, Gujarat, India in Surat. It was commissioned in 1991–92. It is a multi-product, fully integrated complex, manufacturing a wide range of petrochemicals, polymers, polyesters and polyester intermediates. Naphtha is the main raw material of this manufactory, A Naphtha cracker facility crackes the Naphtha and feeds the downstream fiber intermediates, plastics and polyester plants. The manufactory consists integrated utilities system which includes raw water, cooling water, demineralized water, fire water, compressed air, nitrogen, steam/condensate and a Coal based Captive power plant.

== History ==
It was the third by main manufacturing complex established by RIL, First at Naroda, Second at Patalganga and third at Hazira. The MEG plant was commissioned in 1991 in technical collaboration with Lummus Crest BV (Netherlands). In 1991-92 Reliance Industries established a petrochemical manufacturing plants to produce PVC-VCM and Polyethylene in technical collaboration with BF Goodich and DuPont respectively. A new Coal based Captive power plant was commissioned in 2016 having capacity of 4*93 MW, The 5 CFBC Boilers each having capacity of 500 TPH and ESP were constructed by Thermax and 4 Steam turbines each of 93 MW capacity were commissioned by BHEL.

== See also ==
- Jamnagar Refinary
- Reliance Vadodara Manufacturing Division (VMD)
- Reliance Dahej Manufacturing Division (DMD)
