= Microsoft Pix =

Microsoft Pix is a camera phone application developed by Microsoft Research for iOS.

Microsoft Research announced Pix in July, 2016, calling it an "intelligent camera app". It is built in part on technology originally developed for Photosynth.

Its features include:

- Adjusting settings automatically for faces.
- Combining photos from before and after the shutter button is pressed. Normally it captures ten frames, selects the three best, and combines those to reduce noise.
- Creation of comix.
- Document capture, including business cards.
- Focusing on objects of interest.
- Short, looping videos.
- Stylizing.
- Video stabilization and time-lapse.
