= Reliance Dahej Manufacturing Division =

Chemical plant in Gujarat, India

- Location within India
- Location: Dahej, Gujarat, India
- Coordinates: 21.692313°N 72.573313°E
- Industry: Petrochemical
- Products: petrochemicals - ethylene, propylene, EDC, polymers - VCM-PVC, PET, HDPE, EVA; polyester intermediates - Purified Terephthalic Acid, Mono-ethylene Glycol, EO/EG
- Area: 1,778 acres (720 ha)
- Owner: Reliance Industries Limited

Dahej Manufacturing Division (DMD) is the manufactory of Reliance Industries Limited located at Dahej, Gujarat, India near Bharuch. It comprises a Gas cracker which cracks Ethane, Propane and produces Ethylene and Propylene as a product and the same is used as a raw material in downstream plants. The raw material like Propane is either imported or availed from RIL refinery at Jamnagar. The manufactory consists integrated utilities system which includes raw water, cooling water, demineralized water, fire water, compressed air, nitrogen, steam/condensate and a coal based captive co-generation power plant of capacity 270 MW.

== History ==
The commissioning of the plant was implemented in two phases, first in 1996 and went on full stream in the year 2000, at that time IPCL was the owner of the plant. In 2007 IPCL merged with RIL and this plant comes under the ownership of RIL.

== See also ==
- Jamnagar Refinary
- Reliance Vadodara Manufacturing Division (VMD)
- Reliance Hazira Manufacturing Division (HMD)
