= Gigapxl Project =

The Gigapxl Project, initiated late in the year 2000 under the impetus of retired physicist Graham Flint, is a large format landscape photography and ultrahigh-resolution scanning and printing technology, developed around custom-built Gigapxl cameras and modern digital scanning and printing equipment and software. Image size on Roll Film is 18″ × 9″ (450 mm × 225 mm), scanned at 5000 dpi giving a resolution of 4 Gigapixel (4,000 Megapixel).

Results can be described in one way as a 4 Gigapixel (4,000 Megapixel) image that has dimensions of 10 x 20 ft - with 3 Megapixel sharpness over included 4 x 6 inch areas.

The Project's near-term goal (last stated in 2007) is to "compile a coast-to-coast "Portrait of America"; photographing in detail, cities, parks and monuments of the US and Canada".

A stated longer-term goal relates to an effort to document thousands of cultural and archaeological sites around the world which cannot be preserved and which inevitably will deteriorate with the passage of time. A prime example can be found in the city of Rome, Italy. Rome's limestone structures, which have stood for thousands of years, have become victims of acid rain. Until quite recently, stonemasons' tool-marks were clearly visible, yet now they have all but vanished. Ultrahigh-resolution, documentary photography can preserve such details for future generations.

In August 2007, Google began incorporating Gigapxl photographic information into Google Earth.

Their official website is no longer operational.
