= Microsoft Live Labs Deepfish =

Software

Deepfish
- Developer: Microsoft
- Final release: Beta / September 30, 2008; 17 years ago
- Preview release: Beta / March 29, 2007; 18 years ago
- Operating system: Windows Mobile
- Type: Mobile browser

Deepfish was an experimental browsing software system for Windows Mobile devices that used a zooming user interface, being developed at Microsoft Live Labs. It aimed to provide a consistent browsing experience on desktops and mobile devices, to display content on the small mobile displays in the same layout as larger displays, and to avoid the need to recode the web-page for small displays.

When a page was opened, it appeared zoomed-out and shrunk, and formatted as would be in a desktop browser. The user could zoom into the certain areas of the page by using a selection rectangle, and pan the zoomed-in page.

Deepfish consisted of a light-weight browser client powered by a server backend which does most of the processing. The server streams only the data that is visible at any moment, which improves load times and responsiveness. Despite the increased speed in Deepfish, it's quite bandwidth heavy and can render pages slowly if it were launched on a device with lower specifications. Whenever a user would zoom in, the zoomed-in high quality has to be downloaded from the server.

The browser was available for preview until a limited number of reviewers had participated.

Deepfish was retired on 30 September 2008 while important features including JavaScript, AJAX, cookies, ActiveX controls and HTTP POST were not implemented.

== See also ==
- Microsoft Live Labs
- Windows Mobile
