= Alexander Todorov =

Bulgarian psychologist

Alexander Todorov is a Bulgarian professor of psychology at the University of Chicago Booth School of Business. Before his current position, he was a professor at Princeton University. His research is focused on how humans perceive, evaluate, and make sense of the social world. Todorov's research on first impressions has received media coverage from the New York Times, The Guardian, The New Yorker, The Daily Telegraph, Scientific American, National Geographic, BBC, PBS, and NPR.

== Early life and education ==
Todorov was born and grew up in Kardzhali, Bulgaria. He was in his first college year at Sofia University when the communist system collapsed in that country.

In 1995, Todorov studied for a year at Oxford University, the UK, and in 1996, he moved to the U.S. Todorov completed a master's degree at the New School for Social Research, New York City, in 1998 and a PhD degree at New York University in 2002.

== Career ==
Since the summer of 2020, Todorov has been a faculty member of University of Chicago Booth School of Business. Currently, Todorov is a Leon Carroll Marshall Professor of Behavioral Science and Rosett Faculty Fellow.

From 2002 through 2020, Todorov was a faculty member of Princeton University. At Princeton University, Todorov was a professor and associate chair of the department of psychology, an associated faculty member of the Princeton Neuroscience Institute, and an affiliated faculty member of the Woodrow Wilson School of Public and International Affairs.

Todorov was a visiting scholar at the Russell Sage Foundation in New York City, at the Institute for Advanced Studies of the University of Bologna, Italy, and a visiting professor at Radboud University, Nijmegen, the Netherlands. Todorov is a recipient of the SAGE Young Scholar Award from the Foundation for Personality and Social Psychology and of Guggenheim Fellowship.

== Selected publications ==
- Face Value: The Irresistible Influence of First Impressions. Princeton University Press, 2017. ISBN 978-0691167497
- Social Neuroscience: Toward Understanding the Underpinnings of the Social Mind. Oxford University Press, 2014. ISBN 978-0199361052
- Brinkman, L., Dotsch, R., & Todorov, A. (2018). Visualising mental representations: A primer on noise-based reverse correlation in social psychology. European Review of Social Psychology.
- Dotsch, R., Hassin, R. R., & Todorov, A. (2016). Statistical learning shapes face evaluation. Nature Human Behaviour. Published online before print November 14, doi: 10.1038/s41562-016-0001.
- Toscano, H., Schubert, T. W., Dotsch, R., Falvello, V., & Todorov, A. (2016). Physical strength as a cue to dominance: A data-driven approach. Personality and Social Psychology Bulletin, 42, 1603–1616.
- Falvello, V. B., Vinson, M., Ferrari, C., & Todorov, A. (2015). The robustness of learning about the trustworthiness of other people. Social Cognition, 33, 368–386.
- Todorov, A., Olivola, C. Y., Dotsch, R., & Mende-Siedlecki, P. (2015). Social attributions from faces: Determinants, consequences, accuracy, and functional significance. Annual Review of Psychology, 66, 519–545.
- Olivola, C. Y., Funk, F., & Todorov, A. (2014). Social attributions from faces bias human choices. Trends in Cognitive Sciences, 18, 566–570.
- Todorov, A., & Porter, J. (2014). Misleading first impressions: Different for different images of the same person. Psychological Science, 25, 1404–1417.
- Mende-Siedlecki, P., Baron, S. G., & Todorov, A. (2013). Diagnostic value underlies asymmetric updating of impressions in the morality and ability domains. Journal of Neuroscience, 33, 19406–19415.
- Todorov, A., Dotsch, R., Porter, J. M., Oosterhof, N. N., & Falvello, V. B. (2013). Validation of data-driven computational models of social perception of faces. Emotion, 13, 724–738.
- Aviezer, H., Trope, Y., & Todorov, A. (2012). Body cues, not facial expressions, discriminate between intense positive and negative emotions. Science, 338, 1225–1229.
- Dotsch, R., & Todorov, A. (2012). Reverse correlating social face perception. Social Psychological and Personality Science, 3, 562–571.
- Said, C. P., & Todorov, A. (2011). A statistical model of facial attractiveness. Psychological Science, 22, 1183–1190.
- Todorov, A., & Oosterhof, N. N. (2011). Modeling social perception of faces. Signal Processing Magazine, IEEE, 28, 117–122.
- Olivola, C. Y., & Todorov, A. (2010). Elected in 100 milliseconds: Appearance-based trait inferences and voting. Journal of Nonverbal Behavior, 34, 83–110.
- Olivola, C. Y., & Todorov, A. (2010). Fooled by first impressions? Re-examining the diagnostic value of appearance-based inferences. Journal of Experimental Social Psychology, 46, 315–324.
- Verosky, S. C., & Todorov, A. (2010). Generalization of affective learning about faces to perceptually similar faces. Psychological Science, 21, 779–785.
- Oosterhof, N. N., & Todorov, A. (2008). The functional basis of face evaluation. Proceedings of the National Academy of Sciences of the US, 105, 11087–11092.
- Todorov, A., Said, C. P., Engell, A. D., & Oosterhof, N. N. (2008). Understanding evaluation of faces on social dimensions. Trends in Cognitive Sciences, 12, 455–460.
- Willis, J., & Todorov, A. (2006). First impressions: Making up your mind after 100 ms exposure to a face. Psychological Science, 17, 592–598.
- Todorov, A., Mandisodza, A. N., Goren, A., & Hall, C. C. (2005). Inferences of competence from faces predict election outcomes. Science, 308, 1623–1626.
