= Gigapixel image =

Digital image bitmap composed of one billion pixels

Gigapixel image of František Kupka's The Cathedral from the Google Art Project. The version shown here has been downsampled to 746.7 MP due to constraints in the JPEG format, but the image is available in original resolution as a tile set on the file description page.

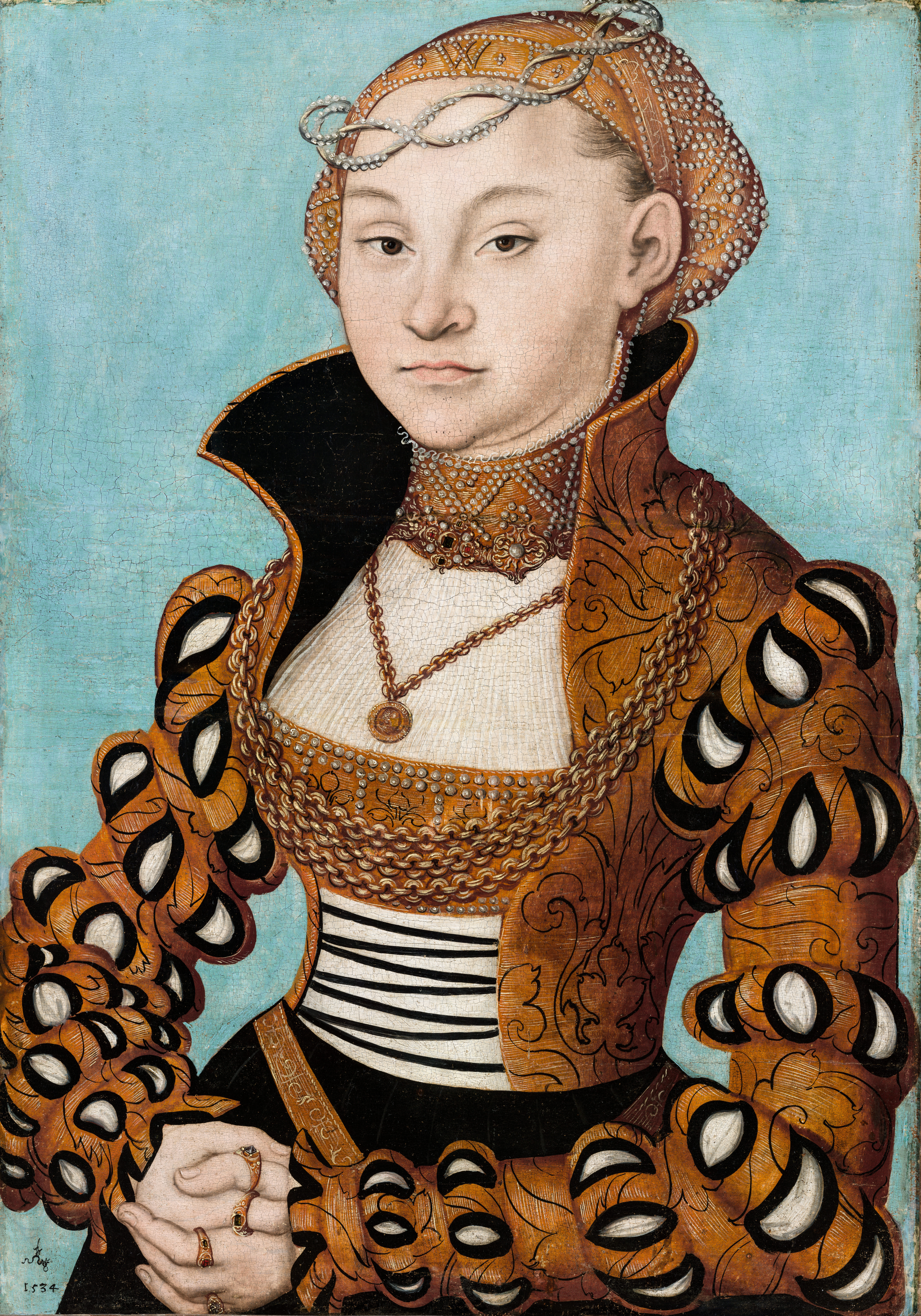
Lucas Cranach l'Ancien, Portrait d'une noble dame saxonne (1534), musée des Beaux-Arts de Lyon. View this picture on the MBALYON website.

A gigapixel rendering of a 2D fractal (~2.15 gigapixels).

A gigapixel image is a digital image bitmap composed of one billion (10^{9}) pixels (picture elements), 1000 times the information captured by a 1 megapixel digital camera. A square image of 31,623 pixels in width and height is one gigapixel. Current technology for creating such very high-resolution images usually involves either making digital image mosaics of many high-resolution digital photographs or using a film negative as large as 12 in × 9 in (30 cm × 23 cm) up to 18 in × 9 in (46 cm × 23 cm), which is then scanned with a high-end large-format film scanner with at least 3000 dpi resolution. Only a few cameras are capable of creating a gigapixel image in a single sweep of a scene, such as the Pan-STARRS PS1 and the Gigapxl Camera.

A gigamacro image is a gigapixel image which is a close-up or macro photograph.

== Terapixel ==
A terapixel image is an image composed of one trillion (10^{12}) pixels. Though currently rare, there have been a few instances such as the Microsoft Research Terapixel project for use on the Fulldome projection system, a composite of medical images by Aperio, and Google Earth's Landsat images viewable as a time-lapse are collectively considered over one terapixel.

In 2015 the 'Terabite', the world's first terapixel macro image, was released by GIGAmacro.

== See also ==
- List of largest photographs
- Powerwall - Computer technology for interactive gigapixel displays
- Gigapan - A Google/NASA/CMU spinout technology that includes a commercially available robotic imager, free stitcher, and web-based viewer
- Gigapxl Project
- Google Cultural Institute
- VR photography
