= Reliance Institute of Life Sciences =

Educational institution in Mumbai, India

- Type: Public
- Founded: 2001; 25 years ago
- Headquarters: Thane-Belapur Road, Rabale Navi Mumbai, Maharashtra 400 701, India
- Key people: Mukesh Ambani (Chairman)
- Website: https://www.rellife.com/web/lifesciences

Reliance Institute of Life Sciences (RILS), established by Dhirubhai Ambani Foundation, is an institution of higher education in various fields of life sciences and related technologies.
