= Gigamacro =

A gigapixel macro image is a digital image bitmap composed of one billion (10^{9}) pixels (picture elements), or 1000 times the information captured by a 1 megapixel digital camera. Creating such high-resolution images involves making mosaics (image stitching) of a large number of high-resolution digital photographs which are then combined into a single image.

Gigapixel macro images are made by 'stacking' a number of photographs together in order to increase the depth of field and then stitching the resulting images together in a technique known as 'stack and stitch'. Such images are usually very large in size and cannot be easily viewed. To make such images accessible, they are converted using tiled image techniques so that they may be viewed in a web browser. Such techniques are familiar in everyday use in e.g. Google Maps.
