= Microsoft Live Labs Pivot =

Data exploration tool by Microsoft

Microsoft Pivot
- Developer(s): Microsoft
- Initial release: November 18, 2009; 15 years ago
- Type: Large-scale data interaction
- Website: microsoft.com/silverlight/pivotviewer/

Pivot is a software application from Microsoft Live Labs that allows users to interact with and search large amounts of data. It is based on Microsoft's Seadragon. It has been described as allowing users to view the web as a web rather than as isolated pages.

After Live Labs were shut down the stand-alone Pivot application is being hosted by Microsoft Research. The Silverlight control is still available, though.

== Functionality ==
Microsoft Pivot was Microsoft Live Labs most ambitious project. It is a program based on the Seadragon technology. More specifically, it is “a data visualization technology called Pivot, designed to help people make better use of digital information”. Pivot is a data mining system that “allows people to visualize data and then sort, organize and categorize it dynamically”, which results in correlations and trends that become immediately apparent in a visually interactive format.

== Capabilities ==
Pivot is a program designed to contextualize information in a much more natural way for humans to digest large quantities of information without losing their way. Most specifically it combines related data — “anything from pictures, videos and maps to batting averages and financials — into large collections that can then be manipulated, sorted, filtered and examined visually”. In this way, the data itself can help shape and inform the way it is presented. Thus, instead of having to struggle to understand data and then apply it to a problem, Pivot works in unison with a person to come to an optimal solution.

Currently information seekers are stuck in the old way of viewing information, limited by browsers to view information only in the context of “next” and “previous”. Pivot allows users to aggregate this information and view it to see if there are any recognizable patterns in the information. The value of such tool is that you can begin exploring with an idea and Pivot works with users to discover information that might have otherwise not been seen. This is important because it has been found that “if you make it a sudden transition, people lose their way…but if you make it very smooth and continuous, people have a mental model of how they got to where they are.”

Another interesting aspect about Pivot is that it works with any type of data. In fact, the Pivot Collections range from Wikipedia entries to the 2009 International Union for Conservation of Nature Endangered List. This gives Pivot immense value because its capabilities are transferable to any industry.

== How Pivot Works ==
At the heart of the Pivot program are the Collections that combine large groups of similar information “so we can begin viewing the Web as a "web" rather than a series of isolated pages”.

New collections can be created with no programming and are composed of a collection of data. These data collections are composed of two components, the XML (the descriptive component of the collection), and the images (the visual representation of the data).

Pivot is able to filter through images and information seamlessly because the images are described in Deep Zoom format, a component of the Seadragon Technology.
