= Gary William Flake =

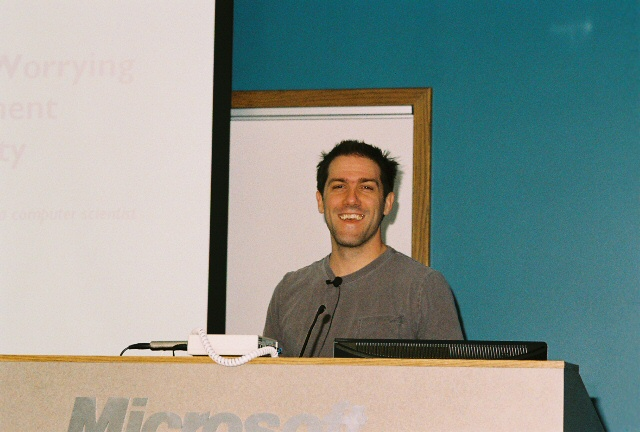
Gary William Flake in 2006

Gary William Flake (born 1966 or 1967) was most recently the CTO of Search at Salesforce.com, which bought and shuttered Clipboard, Inc., of which he was the founder and CEO.

== Background ==
Flake received his bachelor's degree in 1989 from Clemson University. Then he went on to receive his PhD from the University of Maryland, College Park in 1993 in computer science, which is part of the University of Maryland College of Computer, Mathematical, and Natural Sciences. Author of the book, The Computational Beauty of Nature (MIT Press 1998), Flake created a number of publications focused on machine-learning, data-mining, and self-organization. His other research interests have included Web measurements, efficient algorithms, models of adaptation inspired by nature, and time-series forecasting.

In 2000, Flake became a research scientist at NEC Research Institute and the leader of its Web data-mining program. In 2002, he became Overture's Chief Science Officer. After Yahoo merged with Overture, he ran Yahoo! Research Labs, corporate research-and-development activities, and company-wide innovation efforts, and eventually became a vice-president.

After joining Microsoft in 2005, he bridged Microsoft Research and MSN, by founding Microsoft Live Labs and setting the technology vision and future direction of the MSN portal, web-search, desktop-search, and commercial-search efforts. A Microsoft Technical Fellow, he announced via Twitter on October 8, 2010 his resignation from Microsoft as a consequence of its shutting down Live Labs and transitioning its remaining people into Microsoft Bing.

Following Microsoft, Flake founded Clipboard in 2011, where he was CEO. Salesforce acquired Clipboard in 2013, and Flake joined as the CTO for Search. Flake left Salesforce in 2016.

Flake has served on numerous academic conference and workshop organization committees and is a member of the editorial board for the Association for Computing Machinery's Transactions on Internet Technologies.
