= Department of Computer Science, Stony Brook University =

Academic department of Stony Brook University

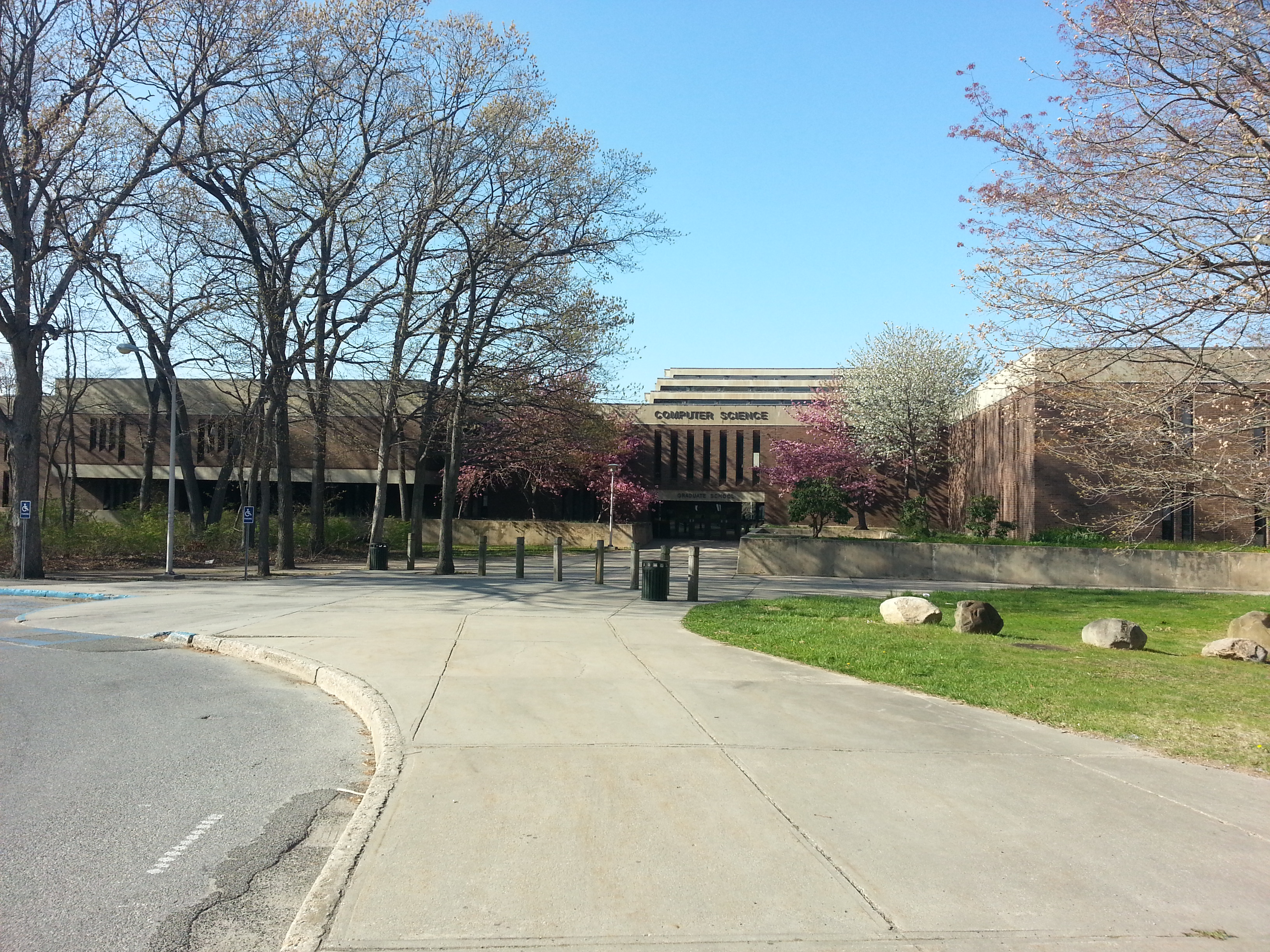

The Department of Computer Science at Stony Brook University in Stony Brook, New York, United States, was established in 1969. It is an academic department focused on computer science education and research. The department completed the NSF-funded Reality Deck project, a 1.5 billion pixel immersive display which is the largest resolution immersive display ever built.
