= Gigapan =

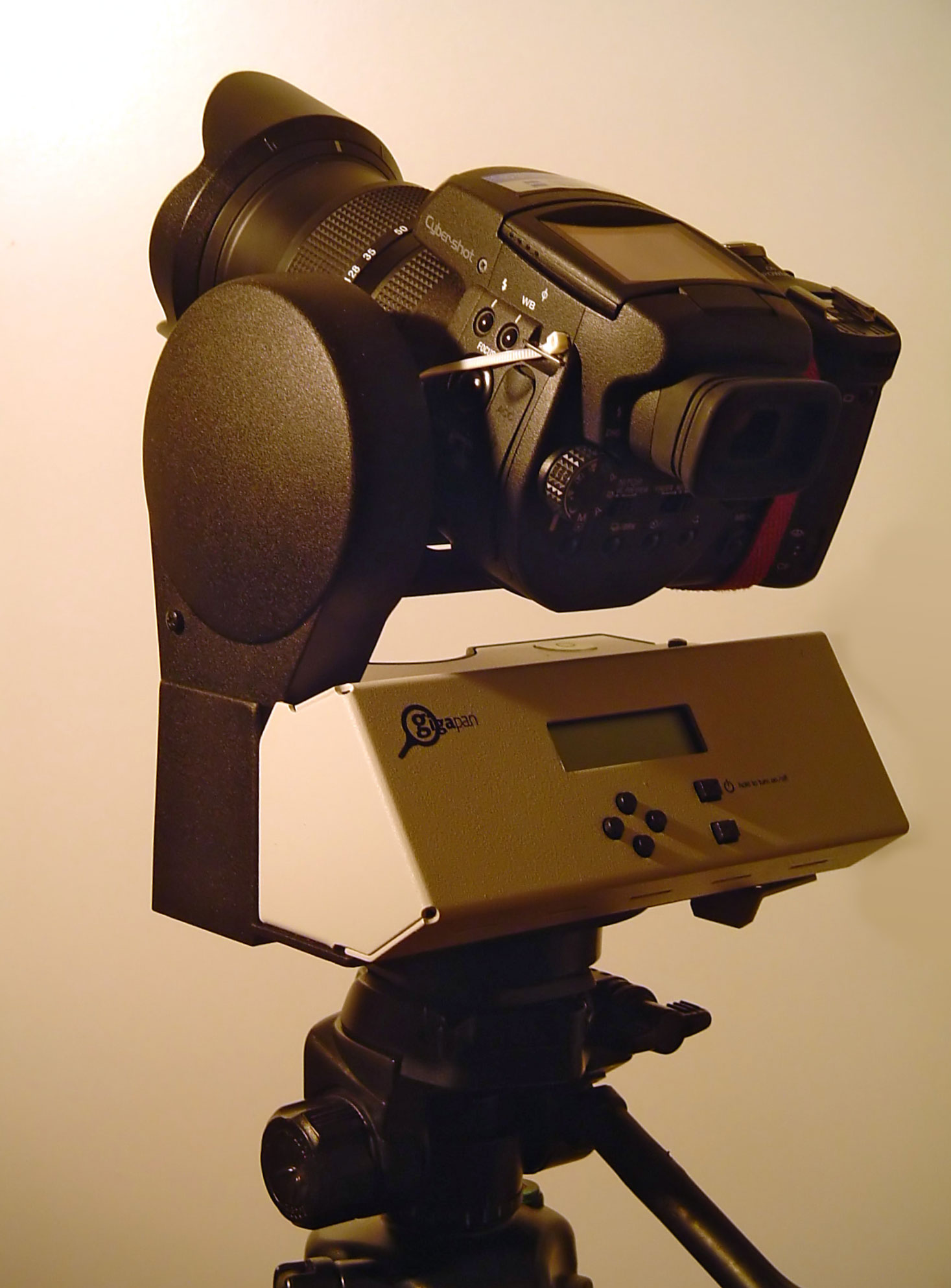
A 2008 beta GigaPan unit with a camera

GigaPan Systems is a global, privately held technology company that provides hardware, software, and services to create and share high-resolution, interactive gigapixel panoramic images. The company is headquartered in Portland, Oregon.

== History ==
GigaPan Systems was founded in 2008 as a collaborative project between Carnegie Mellon University and NASA’s Ames Research Center with support from Google. The original GigaPan robotic hardware and related software were devised for NASA's Mars Spirit and Opportunity Rovers, to capture high-definition panoramas of Mars. The development team was led by Randy Sargent, a senior systems scientist at Carnegie Mellon West and the NASA Ames Research Center in Moffett Field, Calif., and Illah Nourbakhsh, associate professor of robotics at Carnegie Mellon in Pittsburgh.

The project has since grown into an independent company offering solutions for capturing gigapixel images.

== Technology ==
GigaPan Systems combines high-definition images and panoramas with sharing, tagging and zooming capabilities. The company offers a solution for shooting, viewing and exploring high-resolution gigapixel images in a single system. The GigaPan system includes:

- Robotic Camera Mounts: The EPIC series of robotic camera mounts can capture HD, gigapixel photos using almost any digital camera. By setting the upper left and lower right corners of the panorama desired, the EPIC works out how many photos the camera will need to take, and then automatically organizes them into rows or columns.
- GigaPan Stitch Software: GigaPan's image stitching technology automatically combines the hundreds or thousands of images taken with a digital camera using the GigaPan EPIC series into a single image. The software is available for both Mac and Windows.
- GigaPan Viewer: Lets people view images on GigaPan.com or on a third-party website using the GigaPan free, standalone viewer application.
- GigaTag: Allows users to share photos and tag themselves on Facebook within the gigapixel images

== See also ==
- Gigapixel image
- Panorama
- Panorama photography
