= Microsoft Live Labs =

Partnership between MSN and Microsoft Research

Microsoft Live Labs home page.

Microsoft Live Labs was a partnership between MSN and Microsoft Research that focused on applied research for Internet products and services at Microsoft. Live Labs was headed by Dr. Gary William Flake, who prior to joining Microsoft was a principal scientist at Yahoo! Research Lab and former head of research at the Web portal's Overture Services division.

Live Labs' focus was on applied research and practical applications of computer science areas including natural language processing, machine learning, information retrieval, data mining, computational linguistics, distributed computing, etc.

Microsoft Live Labs was formed on January 24, 2006. On October 8, 2010, Microsoft announced the shutdown of Live Labs and the transition of its remaining team of 68 to Microsoft Bing. As a consequence Live Labs' original founder and leader Dr. Gary William Flake has resigned from Microsoft.

== Projects ==
The following table shows all of the projects that had been initiated by Microsoft Live Labs:

Service	Website	Description	Status
ChronoZoom	http://www.ChronoZoom.com/	Zoomable timeline for the field of Big History that stretches from a single day to the Big Bang, based on DeepZoom.	Active, transferred to Microsoft Research
Clipboard		Allowed users to copy/paste operations between web applications in browsers, and between web and desktop applications.	Discontinued
Deepfish		Allowed users to display and zoom into web content on their Windows Mobile devices similar to the desktop format without requiring additional work by the site author	Discontinued
Entity Extraction		Using machine learning to identify meaningful text in documents and turn the unstructured web into a rich set of tagged documents	Discontinued
Listas		Allowed users to create and share lists (text, images, links, RSS feeds, etc.)	Discontinued
Pivot		Allowed users to interact with and search large amounts of data. Based on DeepZoom and Seadragon technologies.	Discontinued
PivotViewer	http://www.microsoft.com/silverlight/pivotviewer/	Silverlight version of the Pivot prototype.	Discontinued
Photosynth	https://web.archive.org/web/20100901205824/http://photosynth.net/	Displays a large collection of photos in a reconstructed three-dimensional space. The product has been discontinued since February 6, 2017	Discontinued
Social Streams		Conducts data mining on social media including blogs, newsgroups and websites, and allows users to see whether the stories are increasing or decreasing in popularity and frequency at a glance using graphs showing the real time movement of the number of mentions of both the people and the places mentioned in the highlighted story	Discontinued
Thumbtack		Allow users to collect contents across different websites and put it into a Thumbtack collection. This collection can then be shared with others or kept private. Gadgets in Thumbtack allows users to compare items in the collection and arrange them according to their needs. The service also utilizes machine learning and natural language techniques to extract information and display them in these gadgets in a meaningful way.	Discontinued
Relay Service		Allowed users to expose a Windows Communication Foundation based service to the Internet from behind a firewall or NAT	Discontinued
Seadragon	http://www.seadragon.com	Smooth, seamless browsing of vast quantities of visual information, on wall sized displays or mobile devices, regardless of the amount of data.	Discontinued
Security Token Service		Online identity management service that provides an Information Card that enables offloading authentication functions, irrespective of the agent signing in is a user logging into web sites and services or a site or service owner to authenticate users. Requires an Information Card compliant store and identity selector to use	Discontinued
Volta		Developer toolset that enables multi-tier web applications by splitting it into different client and server parts	Discontinued
Web Sandbox		Provides website builders a virtualization platform to test the Sandbox and find out whether it prevents the attacks web users most concerned about. On January 26, 2009, Microsoft announced it would release the Web Sandbox source code under the Apache License 2.0.	
zoom.it	http://zoom.it	Service for viewing and sharing high-resolution imagery, based on DeepZoom.	Online

== See also ==
- Windows Live
