= Foundation for Personality and Social Psychology =

The Foundation for Personality and Social Psychology (abbreviated FPSP) is a New York-based non-profit charitable organization that funds research grants and awards to researchers in the fields of personality and social psychology. It was founded in 2006.

== Awards ==
The FPSP funds and awards multiple annual awards to distinguished researchers in personality and social psychology. These awards include the following:

- Caryl Rusbult Close Relationships Early Career Award (2011–present)
- Heritage Dissertation Research Award (2008–present)
- SAGE Young Scholars Awards (in conjunction with SAGE Publications) (2014–present)
