= Panoweaver =

- Developer: Easypano Holdings Inc.
- Stable release: 10.02.181015 / October 15, 2018; 7 years ago
- Written in: C, C++
- Operating system: Windows, macOS
- Available in: English, Japanese, German, Spanish, Italian, French
- License: Commercial proprietary software
- Website: easypano.com

Panoweaver is an image stitching app. It supports telephoto, normal, wide angle and fisheye lens images into full 360*180 spherical panoramic image. Panoweaver also supports exporting 360 panoramic images into Flash VR, QuickTime VR, Java-based VR tours and swf, and publish on Facebook.

The 'free trial version' of Panoweaver is fully functional but creates panoramas with embedded visible watermarks.

Panoweaver pro also includes HDR and tone mapping support.

== List of features ==
Feature	Panoweaver Std	Panoweaver Pro
Automatic stitching: create panoramas	YES	YES
Manual mode: full control over the result	YES	YES
Live preview: see the effect of settings, without the need to stitch first	YES	YES
Multi row panoramas: images can be stacked both horizontally and vertically	YES	YES
Stitch rotated and tilted images	YES	YES
Support for JPEG, TIFF and PNG source images	YES	YES
Create panoramas in JPEG, TIFF or Photoshop format	YES	YES
Photoshop large document (.psb) support	YES	YES
Layered Photoshop output, ideal for retouching	YES	YES
Full support for 16 bit images, for the best image quality	YES	YES
Create templates with frequently used settings	YES	YES
QTVR output	YES	YES
Flash output	YES	YES
HTML5 output	YES	YES
Branding free	-	YES
Batch stitcher: stitch 300 panoramas in one time.	-	YES
Stitch and blend HDR source images into an HDR panorama	-	YES
Stitch and blend bracketed LDR source images into an HDR panorama	-	YES
Calculate camera response curve from bracketed LDR source images	-	YES
Built in tone mapper	-	YES
Support for OpenEXR (.exr) and HDR Radiance (.hdr) source images	-	YES
Blend Priority parameter (useful for blending the nadir image in a spherical panorama)	-	YES
Viewpoint correction	-	YES
Vignetting, exposure and white balance correction	-	YES
Global adjustment of exposure and white balance	-	YES
Exposure Fusion	-	YES
64 bit version	-	YES

== See also ==
Hugin is an open source alternative also based on Panorama Tools
