= CleVR =

Photo sharing site and photo stitching software

- Website type: Panoramic photography, photo sharing
- Owner: Sphex LLP
- Creator: Clementine
- Commercial: Yes
- Registration: Optional
- Launched: November 2000
- Current status: Defunct

CleVR was a free panoramic photo sharing site and photo stitching software. It allowed panoramas to be embedded into other web pages using a Flash viewer. Panoramas could be displayed with hotspots — areas in the scene that could be clicked to display other content or to navigate to another scene. This functionality was similar to that provided by Apple's QuickTime VR, but it allowed images, text and Flash Video (FLV) video to be displayed within the panorama window.

== History ==
CleVR was originally launched by Clementine in 2000 as a platform for managing QuickTime VR content. The name CleVR is a contraction of "Clementine Virtual Reality". At first, panoramas could not be posted by the public, so the site contained virtual tours created by Clementine. In October 2006, the web site re-launched in public beta as a free site that allowed panoramas to be created by anyone. Much of the content from the previous CleVR site was imported to the new platform. The new site was a complete rewrite of the old code, and was no longer based on QuickTime VR. Instead it used a Flash viewer developed by Clementine to display the panoramas. The new site was officially launched in April 2007.

On the current site, the photo stitcher and panorama viewer were developed using Adobe Flash, Flex and AIR. The CleVR site is written in PHP, and uses PEAR and ImageMagick. Images are hosted using Amazon S3.

== Photo stitcher ==
CleVR Stitcher
- Original author: CleVR Ltd.
- Release: September 5, 2007
- Stable release: 1.20080806 / August 6, 2008
- Written in: Actionscript, Adobe Flex
- Operating system: Mac OS X, Microsoft Windows, Linux (alpha)
- Platform: Adobe AIR
- Size: 1.4 MB
- Available in: English
- Type: Photo stitching
- License: Commercial
- Website: www.clevr.com/stitcher

CleVR included free image stitching software integrated with the site. This was an Adobe AIR application, created with Adobe Flex. A Java version was also available. The stitcher generated cylindrical panoramas, the only projection supported by the CleVR website and software. The stitcher had fewer features than other image stitching software, but was designed to be simple and easy to use.

The CleVR photo stitching software could stitch most panoramas without user interaction, but also had support for setting manual control points. While the finished panoramas could be saved to the user's computer as a JPEG file, in most cases they would be uploaded to the CleVR website from within the stitcher.

Users could also use other stitching software to create panoramas and upload them to CleVR.

== Panorama viewer ==
The most distinguishing feature of CleVR was the way it allowed panoramas to be easily shared and posted on other sites. This was done in a manner similar to services such as YouTube, using a Flash-based viewer that could be embedded in a web page or viewed on the CleVR site.

The viewer re-projected the equirectangular panorama to an orthographic projection so that the view appears more natural, without the curved lines otherwise typical for panoramic photographs. It also overlaid the clickable hotspots for navigation and the display of text, images and video.

== See also ==
- PTGui
- Enblend
