= 360 photography =

360 photography may refer to:

- 360 panorama, a photograph spanning a full circle in side
- 360-degree video
- 360-degree interactive photography
- 360 product photography, the rotational photography of a subject

== See also ==
- Image stitching
- Photogrammetry
