= 360-degree video =

Visual arts technique

Sample 360-degree video in 360x180 equirectangular format.

A 360-degree video (or 360° video), also known as surround video, or immersive video or spherical video, is a video recording where a view in all directions is recorded at the same time, shot using an omnidirectional camera or a collection of cameras. The term 360x180 can be used to indicate 360° of azimuth and 180° from nadir to zenith. During playback on normal flat display the viewer has control of the viewing direction like an immersive panorama. It can also be played on a display or projectors arranged in a sphere or some part of a sphere.

== Creation ==
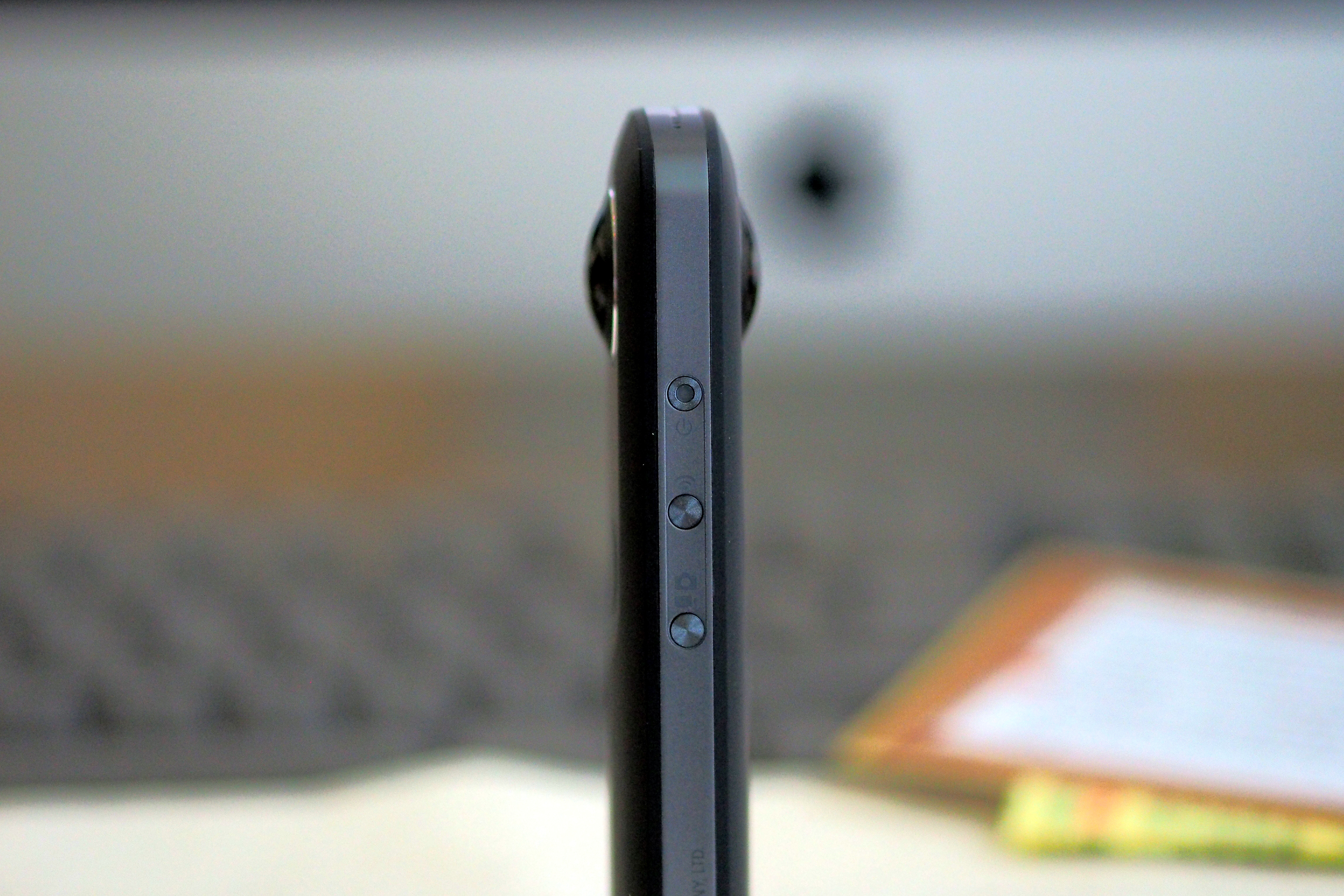
Some omnidirectional cameras contain wide-angle lenses on the front and rear to facilitate the recording of 360-degree video.

360-degree video is typically recorded using either a special rig of multiple cameras, or using a dedicated camera that contains multiple camera lenses embedded into the device, and recording overlapping angles simultaneously. Specialized omnidirectional cameras and rigs have been developed for the purpose of recording 360-degree video, including rigs such as GoPro's Omni and Odyssey (which consist of multiple action cameras installed within a frame), and contained cameras like the Nokia OZO. There have also been handheld dual-lens cameras such as the Ricoh Theta S, Samsung Gear 360, Garmin VIRB 360, and the Kogeto Dot 360—a panoramic camera lens accessory for smartphone cameras.

This separate footage is stitched into one spherical video piece, and the color and contrast of each shot is calibrated to be consistent with the others. This process is done either by the camera itself, or using specialized software that can analyze common visuals and audio to synchronize and link the different camera feeds together. Generally, the only area that cannot be viewed is the view toward the camera support.

360-degree video is typically formatted in an equirectangular projection and is either monoscopic, with one image directed to both eyes, or stereoscopic, viewed as two distinct images directed individually to each eye for a 3D effect. Due to this projection and stitching, equirectangular video exhibits a lower quality in the middle of the image than at the top and bottom. Spherical videos are frequently in curvilinear perspective with a fisheye effect. The heavy barrel distortion often requires rectilinear correction before applications in detection, tracking or navigation.

Some storytellers refer to 360-degree video that uses professional cinematic production techniques such as lighting design, sound design, scenic design, and blocking techniques as cinematic virtual reality (or cine-VR for short).

== Playback ==
360-degree videos are typically viewed via personal computers, mobile devices such as smartphones, or dedicated head-mounted displays. Users can pan around the video by clicking and dragging. On smartphones, internal sensors such as the gyroscope can also be used to pan the video based on the orientation of the device. Taking advantage of this behavior, stereoscope-style enclosures for smartphones (such as Google Cardboard viewers and the Samsung Gear VR) can be used to view 360-degree videos in an immersive format similar to virtual reality. The phone display is viewed through lenses contained within the enclosure, as opposed to virtual reality headsets that contain their own dedicated displays.

== Publishing ==
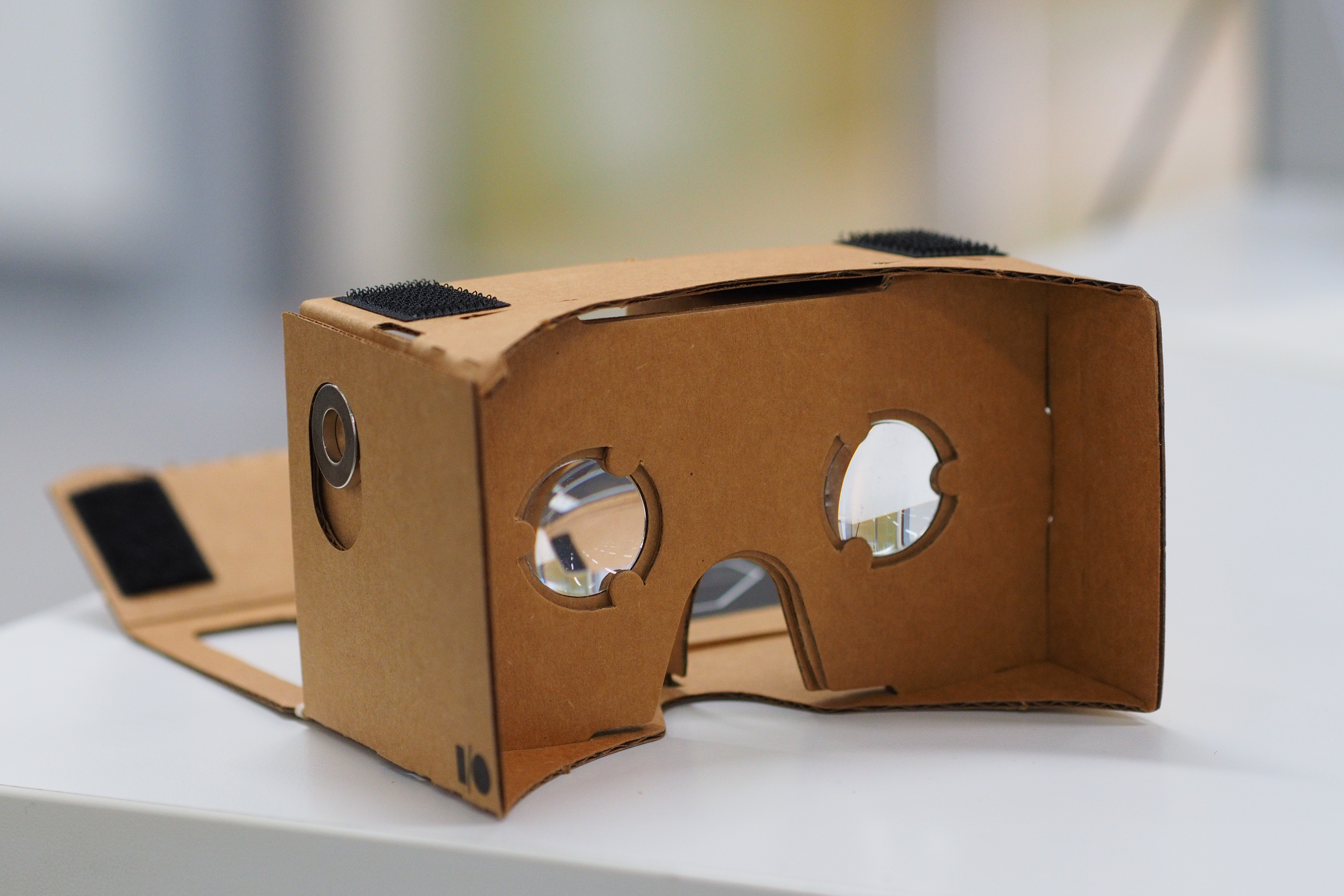
A Google Cardboard viewer.

In March 2015, YouTube launched support for publishing and viewing 360-degree videos, with playback on its website and its Android mobile apps. Parent company Google also announced that it would collaborate with camera manufacturers to make it easier for creators to upload 360-degree content recorded with their products to YouTube. However, in 2017, Google and YouTube began to promote an alternative monoscopic or stereoscopic video format known as VR180, which is limited to a 180-degree field of view, but is promoted as being more accessible to produce than 360-degree video, and allowing more depth to be maintained by not subjecting the video to equirectangular projection.

Facebook (parent company of VR headset maker Oculus VR) followed suit by adding 360-degree video support in September 2015, and subsequently unveiled reference designs for its own 360-degree camera systems known as Facebook Surround 360. Facebook announced in March 2017 that more than 1 million 360-degree videos had been uploaded to Facebook to date. Vimeo also launched 360-degree video support in March 2017.

Google Cardboard, which is typically distributed in the form of do-it-yourself kits consisting of low-cost materials and components, has been credited with helping virtual reality become more readily available to the general public, and helping boost the adoption of 360-degree video by publishers, such as mainstream journalists and media brands.

The use of the term "virtual reality" to describe 360-degree video has been disputed, as VR typically refers to interactive experiences wherein the viewer's motions can be tracked to allow real-time interactions within a virtual environment, with orientation and position tracking. In 360-degree video, the locations of viewers are fixed, viewers are limited to the angles captured by the cameras, and cannot interact with the environment. The non-dynamic nature of video also means that rendering techniques cannot be used to reduce the risk of motion sickness.

== Variations ==
- 6DOF video: stereoscopic 360-degree video which also captures depth and allows for six degrees of freedom in navigation within the captured environment
- Volumetric video

== See also ==
- 3D film
- Cinematography
- Digital cinema
- 360 photography (disambiguation)
- 360 video projection
- 360 degree camera
- MSG Sphere
