= AutoStitch =

Image stitching software

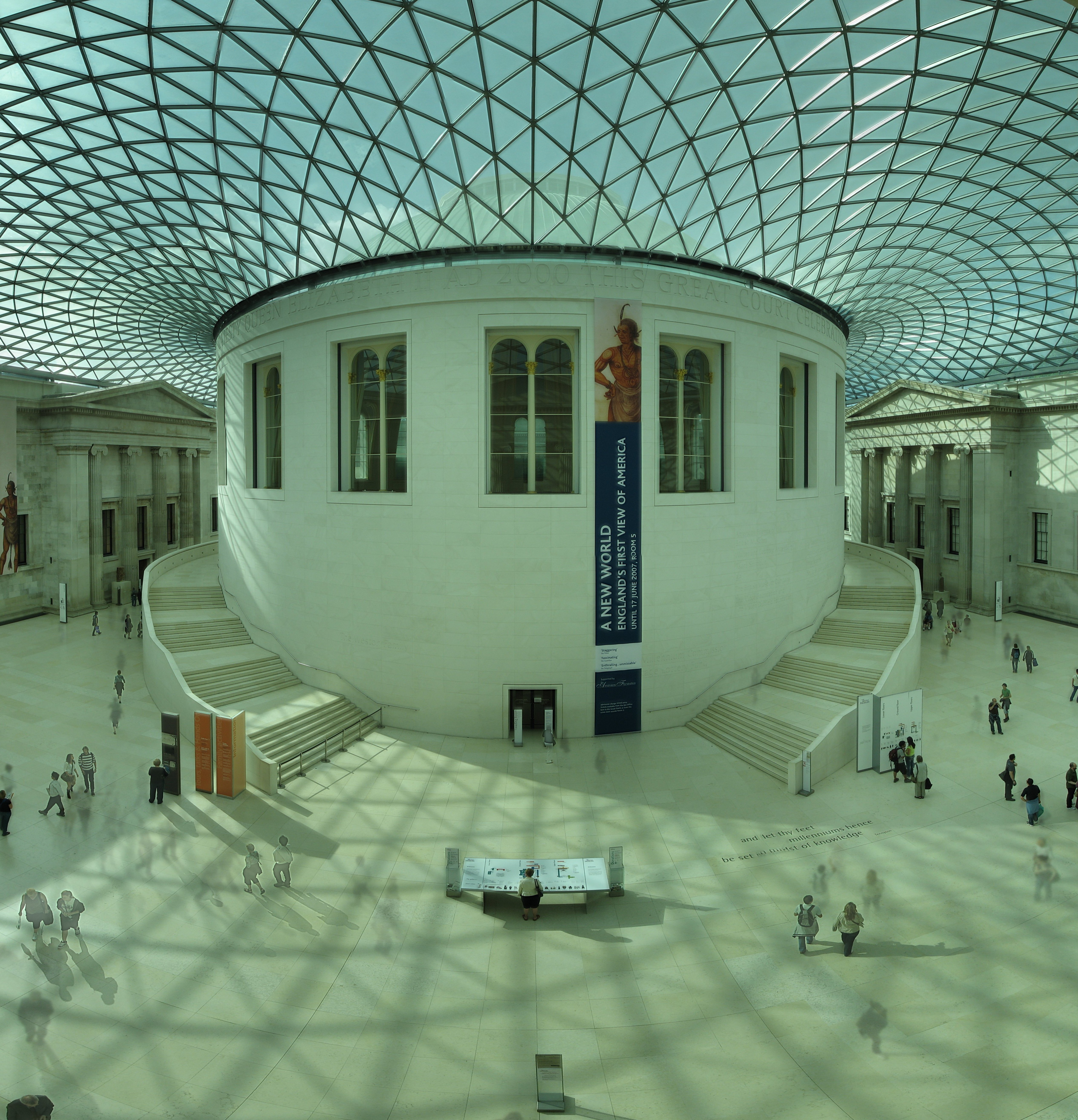
Example AutoStitch image

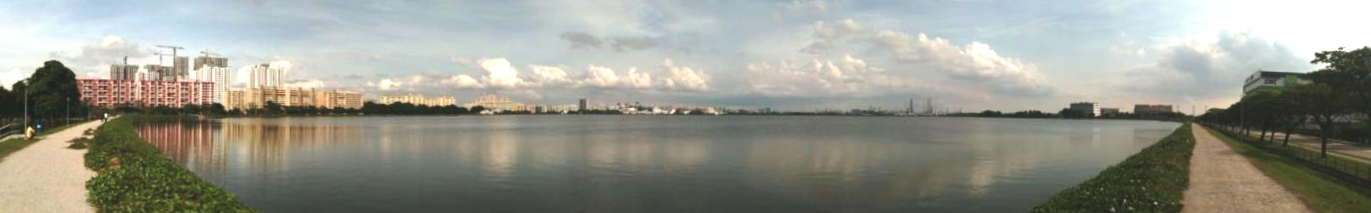
Example AutoStitch image

AutoStitch is a proprietary image-stitching software tool for creating panoramas. It was developed by Matthew Brown and David G. Lowe of the University of British Columbia.

The software uses SIFT and RANSAC. It differs from some other image-stitching software in that it automatically and seamlessly stitches together even unaligned or zoomed photographs without user input, whereas others often require the user to highlight matching areas for the photographs to be merged properly. The only requirement is that all photographs be taken from a single point.

Other software such as Hugin has recently added the ability to stitch images without user input as well.
