= Panorama Tools =

Programs and software for joining images

- Original author: Helmut Dersch
- Developer: Helmut Dersch
- Initial release: 1998; 27 years ago
- Stable release: 13-2.9.21 / 30 December 2021; 3 years ago
- Written in: C
- Type: post-production
- License: GNU Lesser General Public License (relicensed from GNU GPL 2007)
- Website: panotools.sourceforge.net

Panorama Tools (also known as PanoTools) are a suite of programs and libraries for image stitching, i.e., re-projecting and blending multiple source images into immersive panoramas of many types. It was originally written by German physics and mathematics professor Helmut Dersch. An updated version of the Panorama Tools library serves as the underlying core engine for many software panorama graphical user interface front ends.

== History ==
Dersch started development on Panorama Tools in 1998, producing software available for creating panoramas and more, but had to stop development in 2001 due to legal harassment and claims of patent infringement by the company IPIX. Dersch released the core library (pano12) and some of the programs of Panorama Tools under the terms of the GNU General Public License. The rest of the applications were made available as binary executables only and for free without a copyleft license.

The development of the source code of Panorama Tools was continued by some members of the original Panorama Tools mailing list. In December 2003 they initiated a free software project which is currently hosted by SourceForge. SourceForge requires that all hosted software is released under an open source license. For this reason Dersch's unlicensed binaries are not hosted there, although they can still be found on mirror websites.

On 5 August 2007, Dersch announced his intention to relicense the Panorama Tools source code. On 9 August 2007, Dersch changed the license to a GNU Lesser General Public License.

== Sub-components ==
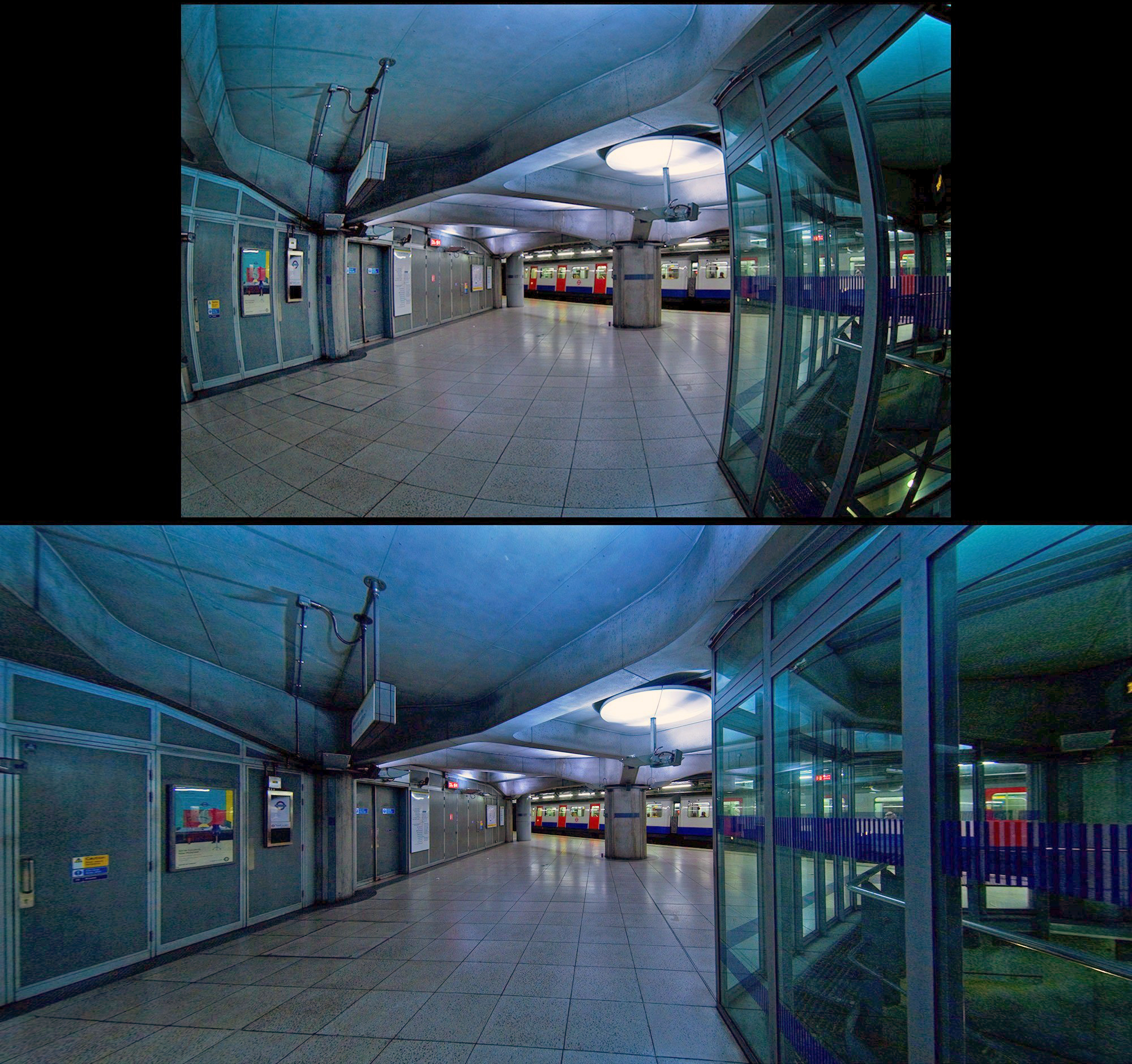
An example of Panorama Tools' ability to remap an image shot with a fisheye lens (top) into rectilinear perspective (bottom).

=== Original release ===
PanoTools consists of the following components:

PTEditor
Java interactive panorama editor.
PTPicker
Java front end to panorama stitcher and other tools. It provides a graphical interface for feature point selection and position optimization.
PTCrypt
Java tool for scrambling pictures intended to be viewed on-line with PTViewer.
PTStitcher
Panorama stitching tool which remaps, adjusts and combines arbitrary images to panoramic views.
PTOptimizer^{†}
Optimizes positions and sizes of images using control-point data.
PTStereo
Creates 3-dimensional objects from 2 or more stereoscopic images.
PTInterpolate
Physically valid true view interpolator. Given two images of the same scene taken from different positions, this tool creates views from any intermediate position.
PTMorpher
Morphing tool.
PTAverage
Averages images to reduce noise and enhance density.
PTStripe
Combines images into movie-stripes for viewing in object-viewers (PTMovie extension to PTViewer).
PanoTools Plugins
Photoshop, GraphicConverter and GIMP plug-ins for image correction and remapping. Also compatible to many other programs that can use Photoshop plug-ins.
pano12 library^{†}
The underlying panorama library, currently used by several different panorama front-ends and command line programs.
pano13 library^{†}
Current version of the library. No longer compatible with programs for which no source code is available.

^{†}Open source.

=== Further developments ===
In 2006 the functionality of PTstitcher was reproduced by the developers of Panorama Tools. Its functionality was broken into several program, in an attempt to modularize it:

PTmender^{†}
Remaps one image at a time
PTblender^{†}
Implements the rudimentary colour correction algorithm found in later versions of PTstitcher
PTmasker^{†}
Computes stitching masks. It implements the ability to increase depth-of-field by stacking images
PTroller^{†}
Takes a set of images and merges them into a single one
PTcrop^{†}
Crops an image to its outer rectangle.
PTuncrop^{†}
Opposite of PTcrop: takes a cropped file and creates an uncropped one.
PTtiff2psd^{†}
Takes a series of input images and creates a Photoshop PSD file where each input file is a layer.

^{†}Open source.

=== Front-ends and applications ===
To make working with Panorama Tools easier and to add functionality, many interactive, graphical front-ends to Panorama Tools have been developed, both open source (e.g. Hugin) and commercial (e.g. PTgui and PTMac), along with a variety of other companion applications (e.g. smartblend and enblend), which in many cases make interacting directly with the programs in the original Panorama Tools toolset unnecessary.
