= Image mosaic =

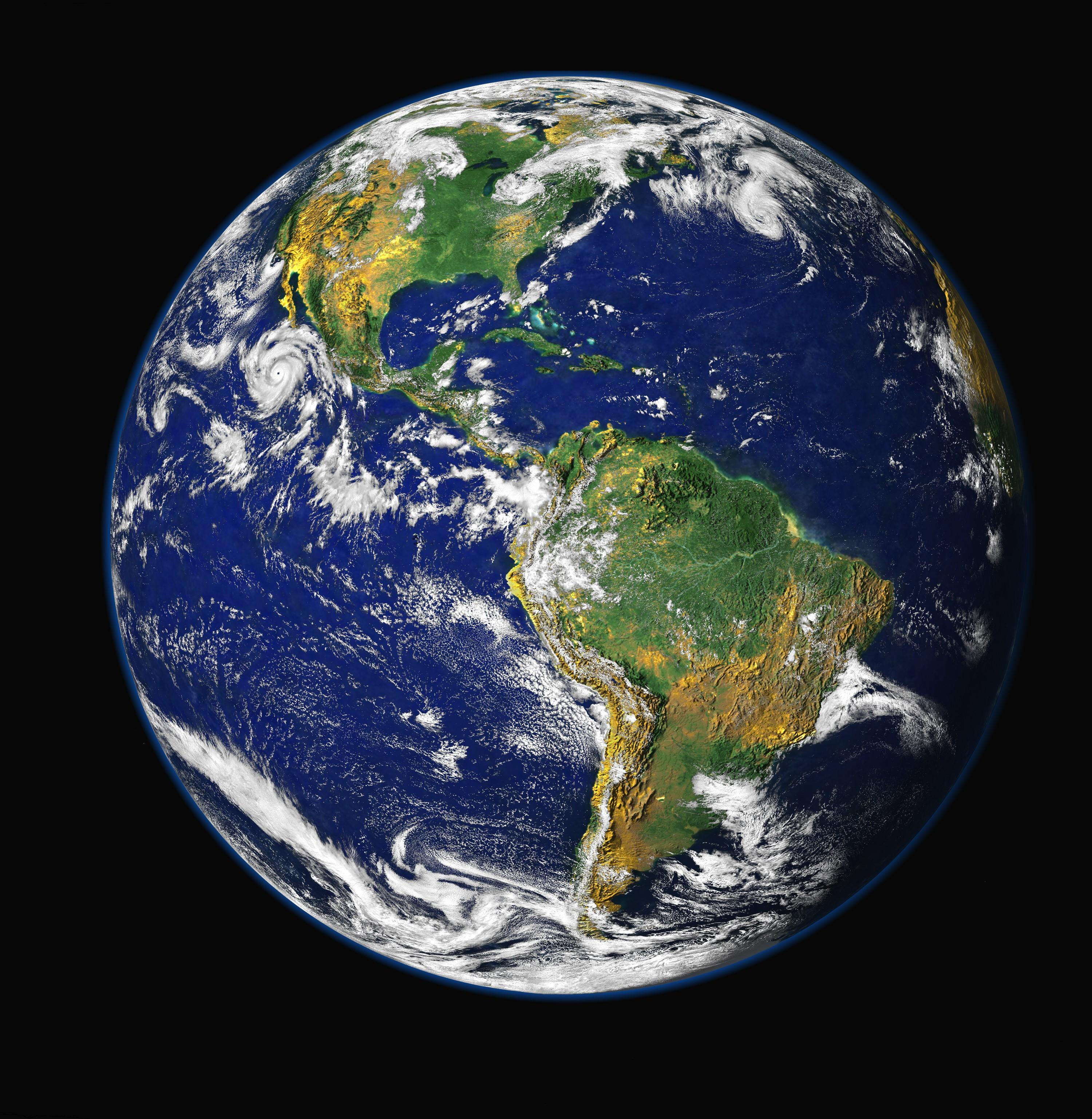
Satellite images can be combined to produce a mosaic of an entire hemisphere.

In remote sensing, an image mosaic or photo mosaic is a compound image or photograph created by stitching together a series of adjacent aerial pictures or satellite images of the Earth. Space scientists have been assembling mosaics of this kind since at least as early as the Soviet satellite missions to the Moon in the late 1950s.

== See also ==
- Orthophotomosaic
