= Enblend =

Software tool for merging images

- Original author: Andrew Mihal
- Developer: Hugin team (Christoph Spiel)
- Stable release: 4.2 / 29 March 2016; 9 years ago
- Repository: hg.code.sf.net/p/enblend/code
- Written in: C++
- Operating system: Cross-platform
- Available in: English
- License: GNU GPL 2+
- Website: enblend.sourceforge.net

Enblend-Enfuse are open source console application created by Andrew Mihal and mostly maintained by Hugin developers. It consists of Enblend, an image blending tool useful for creating panoramas, and Enfuse, an exposure fusion (HDR merging) and focus stacking tool that combines the depth of field and dynamic range from multiple images of the same scene (bracketing). Enblend-enfuse accepts images already aligned by other methods.

== Technique ==
Enblend uses the Burt-Adelson spline for blending.

Enfuse uses the Mertens-Kautz-Van Reeth (MKVr) approach to exposure fusion, which does not require reconstructing an HDR intermediate. The MKVr approach involves blending images by quality estimates based on contrast, saturation, and well-exposedness. Enblend extends the estimate with a fourth term of information entropy, and allows the user to decide the weights of each quality estimator as well as specific implementations of the estimators. For example, a basic focus stack is combined in Enfuse by having the quality estimator only consider contrast, and by having the MKVr blending only use the single best-scoring pixel.

== Frontends ==
Enfuse is used in a number of other tools:

- Hugin, an open-source panorama tool, uses Enblend-Enfuse for blending and HDR handling. Hugin provides align_image_stack, which aligns images so that Enfuse can process them.
- EnfuseGUI, an open source multi-processor GUI for enfuse mainly focused on HDR merging.
- MacroFusion, another open source GUI for enfuse.
- Enfusion, another Windows GUI for Enfuse, with a focus on simplicity.
