= PTGui =

- Developer: New House Internet Services BV
- Initial release: July 27, 2001; 24 years ago
- Stable release: 13.0 / January 31, 2025; 11 months ago
- Written in: C, C++
- Operating system: Windows, macOS
- Available in: English, Russian, French, Spanish, Korean, Chinese (simplified), German, Japanese, Dutch, Portuguese
- Type: Raster graphics editor
- License: Commercial proprietary software
- Website: ptgui.com

PTGui is a panorama photo stitching program for Windows and macOS developed by New House Internet Services BV. PTGui was created as a GUI frontend to Helmut Dersch's Panorama Tools. It features its own stitching and blending engine along with compatibility to Panorama Tools. PTGui supports telephoto, normal, wide angle and fisheye lenses to create partial cylindrical up to full spherical panoramas. PTGui can handle multiple rows of images.

Originally released for Windows, version 6.0.3 introduced support for Mac OS X.

The 'free trial version' of PTGui is fully functional but creates panoramas with embedded visible watermarks.

PTGui Pro also includes HDR and tone mapping support.

The upcoming version 13 beta 8 - though as of Nov. 2024 still slated as beta status, is now reported as quite reliable after 8 iterations - includes the following new features: a Patch Editor (PTGui Pro only), DNG output, improved RAW / DNG handling, and JPEG 2000 support.
Version 13 beta 8 also claims significant performance improvements when optimizing large panoramas and also a speedier optimum seam finding algorithm.

== See also ==
- Hugin – an open source alternative also based on Panorama Tools
