= IPIX =

IPIX was an imaging technology company headquartered in Cohoes, New York. It supplies hardware and software for producing, publishing, embellishing, and collaborating with spherical imagery.

== History ==
IPIX Corporation, successor-in-interest to Internet Pictures Corporation, Bamboo.com Inc., Omniview Inc., and TeleRobotics International, was originally an imaging technology company headquartered in Oak Ridge, Tennessee. One of its products was visual technology allowing the stitching of panoramic images into 360°x 180° field of view video and photography. The company's stock was traded on NASDAQ (IPIXQ).

Their .ipx format was for a time a widely used virtual image type for hotel and real estate websites. 'IPIX Interactive Studio', could create IPIX's proprietary format, QuickTime Cubic VR images, Equirectangular and Cylindrical Projections as JPEGs that could be viewed with Helmut Dersch's freeware Java PTViewer, Shockwave w3d files, VRML files and X3D files. Two plug-ins are available that can create images in the RealViz format and iSeeMedia's PhotoVista format.

IPIX licensing method was as follows. The proprietary IPIX software "IPIX Wizard" could seam any number of fisheyes (or retouched fisheyes) into a .ipx and would only allow viewing of the image for quality control purposes. Users wanting to save the .ipx file would "spend" an IPIX key. These keys could be purchased from the IPIX store for $25 each, or less if purchased in bulk. Resellers could purchase these keys and offer IPIX services while charging more than $25 per sold .ipx picture. Minds-Eye-View ("MEV"), the company that bought what remained of IPIX continued this licensing method and continues to use the IPIX name.

IPIX patented its Omniview motionless camera orientation system, and has claimed that this patent covered techniques for creating 360-degree images using two fish-eye photographs. It pursued an active policy of filing patent lawsuits against any company or individual that developed similar technologies, Helmut Dersch and the company Infinite Pictures being the most notable examples. The company also filed lawsuits against photographers using software it considered to be infringing its patents. The company was widely criticized for these lawsuits. Among the arguments against the patent claims were the existence of prior art, and that these lawsuits have acted to put a damper on the development of interactive immersive image technologies. It was also argued that some of their claims are too broad, suggesting that any geometric remapping of a fisheye image is their invention. In the end it turned out that IPIX itself was in violation of a prior patent held by Pictosphere, and in court attempted to use the same defense that had been used against them in the past. They lost the suit.

On July 31, 2006, IPIX filed for bankruptcy after posting a 3.8 million dollar loss for the first part of 2006. They had posted a $347 million loss in the tech crash in 2001.

Before going bankrupt IPIX had finished developing a technology called i-movies or vPix, streaming video in 360 degrees again without moving cameras. The technology could allow an infinite number of viewers to "move" their own camera and viewing space in a live televised event. The technology was not further marketed.

On January 19, 2007, it auctioned off a block of 28 patents for $3.6 million, to an anonymous bidder which later revealed itself to be Sony.

On March 27, 2007 Minds-Eye-View won the auction for the remaining IPIX assets, including the trademark name, software and websites. Quotes by Minds-Eye-View president Ford Oxaal suggest the IPIX brand and products will continue to be available.
