= 360 product photography =

Photographic technique

Example of dual-axis spin photography

360 photography (also referred to as 360 product photography, 360 spin or spin photography) refers to a photographic technique by which a series of photos give the impression of an object rotating. These photos can be displayed as an interactive animation on web pages and apps, allowing a user to control the rotation of an object. The photos can also be displayed as an infinitely looping GIF or video.

360 photography is used primarily by ecommerce websites, to give shoppers a more realistic impression of a product than static images. The use of interactive 360 spins has been linked to an increase in sales conversions and lower returns of unwanted goods.

== Types of 360 spin ==
There are 3 types of 360 photography spin: single-row spins, multi-row spins and twin-axis spins.

Single-row spins are the most commonly used type of 360 spin because they are the easiest to create. One row of photos is usually sufficient to give a lifelike impression of an object. These spins can be moved left and right only. They are often composed of 36 images (each separated by 10 degrees), though any number of images can be used. More frames per rotation will provide a more fluid rotation; fewer frames will feel more jumpy. While the cost of 360 photography falls and bandwidth increases, spins with 72 or more frames are becoming more commonplace, for their smoother, sophisticated experience.

Multi-row spins (also known as 3D spins) can be rotated up and down as well as left and right. These can be in the form of 'hemi-spherical' or 'full-spherical' product views. They are composed of 360 product image sets shot at multiple rows. Each row is photographed at a different camera angle, allowing the product to be viewed from multiple perspectives. Multi-row spins require more time and effort to photograph, so they are suited to products that benefit from being viewed from above and/or underneath.

== Capture ==
Photographers typically capture 360 photography in a photography studio by using a turntable, camera, tripod, lights and a white background. To obtain a pure white background, a white lightbox or light tent can be used to help light the object evenly, though these can flatten the image, so some photographers use a white sheet or white card in the background. Bottom lit turntables or a clear-acrylic stand placed on top of a turntable can help eliminate shadows.

Turntables used by 360 product photographers are usually powered, for automatic, precision rotation. A product is placed in the center of the turntable and a camera, typically mounted on a tripod, captures photos of the product at even internals (ex. 72 frames = 1 capture every 5 degrees) as the turntable rotates. This process typically involves capturing multiple images from evenly spaced angles using controlled lighting conditions, followed by assembling the frames into an interactive sequence that allows users to rotate the product seamlessly.

Specialized 360 photography turntables work in stop motion - pausing the rotation when each photo is captured to ensure for a sharp image. Basic turntables rotate continuously, which can cause slightly blurred photos if shooting at a slower shutter speed. These motorized continuous spin turntables but are suitable for capturing video, which can later be converted to a 360 spin.

Some photography turntables can be connected by USB cable to computer and/or camera, allowing remote shutter release or USB to capture the images. Such automation speeds up the photography process, which is an important consideration when hundreds or thousands of products are to be photographed.

Further automation can be achieved by employing robotic arms to move the camera up and over an object, to quickly capture multi-row spins. Robotic equipment is typically employed by specialist 360 photography studios, enabling them to capture high quality photos rapidly. Such equipment has helped reduce the cost of 360 photography to approximately 20-40 USD per product for simple products such as shoes, when photographed in large batches. Prices are higher for reflective objects, large objects and garments worn on a model or mannequin.

All-in-one lightbox machines are a simpler method for capturing spins. These machines have an automated rotating turntable with lighting all around and above. They connect to a camera and computer, for automated capture.

Amateur photographers can capture 360 spins on a low budget by using a simple lazy susan instead of a powered turntable. The photographer can manually rotate the turntable between each frame. This is a slow process, thus impractical for large volume of making it an uncommon method of capturing 360 spins. Thus, specialized 360 product photography tools are suggested for high volume work.

The final method of creating 360 degree spins is by using 3D CAD modelling software. A product model can be constructed by a skilled 3D model designer, then rendered as a series of static JPEG/PNG images ready for use.

== Editing ==
Once all the images for a complete rotation have been captured, they normally require refinement in a photo-editing program with batch editing capability. The typical edits required are to crop closer to the object edge, mask out any background objects, adjust the colour balance to match the products true colour and adjust colour levels to whiten the background. Most ecommerce sites wish to display 360 spins against a pure white background, which is not usually achieved direct from the camera. Batch editing can be applied in dedicated 360 photo software or in common photo editing programs such as Adobe Photoshop and Adobe Lightroom.

If adjusting colour levels and colour balance is insufficient in obtaining a pure white background, background removal may be required, either with an automated tool or by manual masking by a human editor. Professional photo retouching services are often employed for this manual work.

== Publication ==
To display images as an interactive spin on a web page, a JavaScript image viewer is required. The JavaScript works by displaying one image after another, giving the feeling of the object rotating. The user can drag the image left/right (or up/down) as if moving a real object.

JavaScript image viewers are either part of a hosted 360 image service or a standalone script. Hosted services work by uploading images to the service, from where they are served with the scripts. Upon upload, hosted services automatically create the spin, resize and optimise the images for fast loading. Image optimisation is of particular importance for 360 spin because the total file size of 36 or more images is considerable. Hosted services reduce file size and often deliver the images from a CDN, helping the spin to download quickly. Hosted 360 services can also serve spins as GIFs or videos, which are suitable for embedding spins in social media and other websites where JavaScript is not permitted.

Standalone scripts are installed on a web server, with some basic configuration. Images should be resized and optimized either before upload or on the server by an image processing service. Some ecommerce sites automatically resize and optimize images on upload, which can accelerate the configuration process. If using an ecommerce platform there are plugins to make it faster to configure and embed 360 spin scripts in product pages.

== See also ==
- VR photography
