= QuickTime VR =

Digital file format

- Filename extension: .qtvr
- Internet media type: video/quicktime x-world/x-qtvr
- Developed by: Apple Inc.
- Initial release: July 1995; 30 years ago
- Type of format: Image file format
- Contained by: QuickTime File Format
- Open format?: No

QuickTime VR (also known as QTVR) is an image file format developed by Apple Inc. for QuickTime, and discontinued along with QuickTime 7. It allows the creation and viewing of VR photography, photographically captured panoramas, and the viewing of objects photographed from multiple angles. It functions as plugins for the QuickTime Player and for the QuickTime Web browser plugin.

== History ==
QuickTime VR was conceived in 1991 by programmers Eric Chen and Ian Small of the Human Interface Group in the Advanced Technology Group at Apple, utilizing a Cray supercomputer to process images into panoramas. It was soon made prominent within the company by Apple's board member and former astronaut Sally Ride, who was fascinated by the demonstrated possibilities of 3D computer imagery.

The first way I did panoramic photography was a little bit of a cheat. So what you do is, you take a million pictures and you animate between them. I did all this with a single camera, because imagining the matrix of cameras we now use was just too expensive. It was extremely onerous, the stitching and all of that. It was quite a lot of work. The head-mounted VR did exist at that time. So it was a poor man's VR. Calling it VR was controversial and somewhat presumptuous.

— Dan O'Sullivan, early QuickTime VR engineer

It was publicly launched in 1995 as part of QuickTime 2, by a dedicated group including Chen, Small, senior content engineer Ted Casey, and program manager Eric Zarakov. Apple sold the content authoring tools for US$2,000 (equivalent to $4,200 in 2025) plus a $0.40-0.80 royalty fee per commercial CD-ROM disc depending on the number of QuickTime VR movies, or no royalty charge for non-commercial usage. Upon launch, it was a supporting technology in digital publications such as the Star Trek: The Next Generation Interactive Technical Manual. The first high-profile public application of QuickTime VR is the 1995 courtroom visualization of the crime scenes in the O. J. Simpson murder case.

The platform was deemphasized upon the return of Steve Jobs to Apple in 1997. The discontinuation of QuickTime 7 in the late 2000s brought the end of development and support of QuickTime VR and other major technologies.

== Overview ==
=== Panoramas ===
Panoramas are panoramic images which surround the viewer with an environment (inside, looking out), yielding a sense of place. They can be stitched together from several normal photographs or 2 images taken with a circular fisheye lens, or captured with specialized panoramic cameras, or rendered from 3D-modeled scenes. There are two types of panoramas:

- Single row panoramas, with a single horizontal row of photographs.
- Multi-row panoramas, with several rows of photographs taken at different tilt angles.

Panoramas are further divided into those that include the top and bottom, called cubic or spherical panoramas, and those that do not, usually called cylindrical.

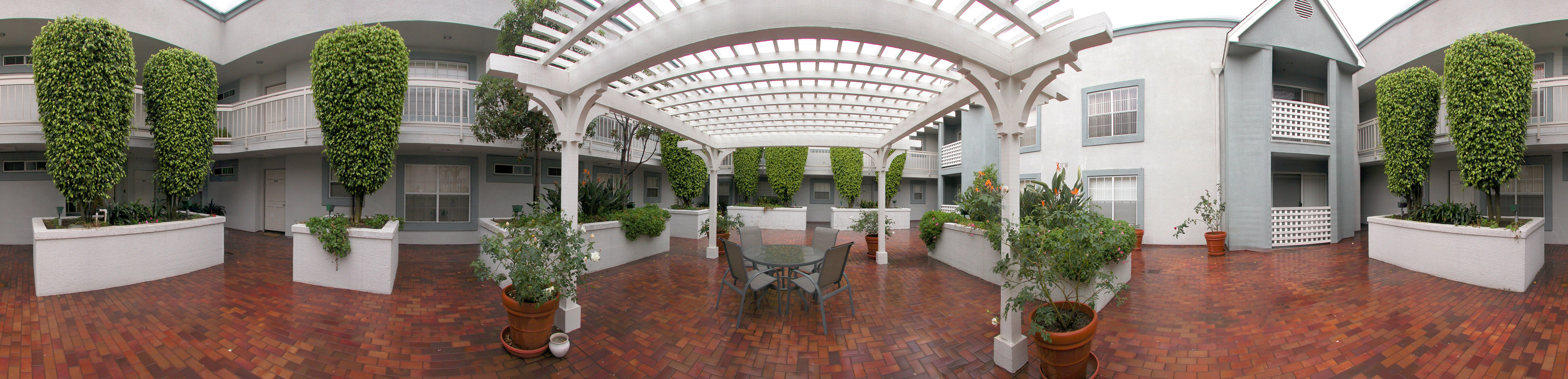
This cylindrical panorama was shot with a Nikon Coolpix 5000 and stitched with Apple Inc.'s QuickTime Authoring Studio.

A single panorama, or node, is captured from a single point in space. Several nodes and object movies can be linked together to allow a viewer to move from one location to another. Such multinode QuickTime VR movies are called scenes.

Apple's QuickTime VR file format has two representations for panoramic nodes:

- cylindrical, consisting of one 360° image wrapped around the viewer
- cubic, consisting of a cube of six 90° × 90° images surrounding the viewer.

Each of these are typically subdivided or tiled into several smaller images, and stored in a special kind of QuickTime movie file, which requires the QuickTime plugin.

Hot spots can be embedded into the panorama, which when selected can invoke some action, for example moving to another panorama node.

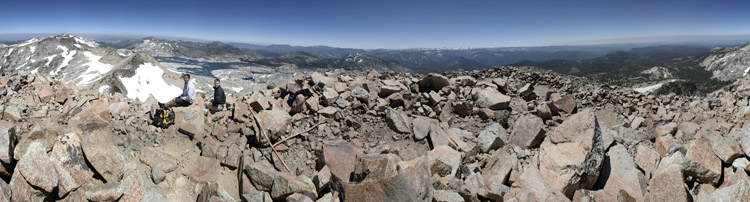
This cylindrical panorama was shot with a Canon Digital Rebel XT.

=== Objects ===
In contrast to panoramas, which are captured from one location looking out at various angles, objects are captured from many locations pointing in toward the same central object.

The simplest type of objects to capture are single row, typically captured around the equator of an object. This is normally facilitated by a rotating turntable. The object is placed on the turntable, and photographed at equal angular increments (usually 10°) from a camera mounted on a tripod.

Capturing a multi-row object movie requires a more elaborate setup for capturing images, because the camera must be tilted above and below the equator of the object at several tilt angles.

== Reception ==
In 1995, MacWorld cited some pioneering multimedia developers with a shared viewpoint fanatically in favor of QuickTime VR technology but against Apple's $0.40-$0.80 royalty fee per commercial CD-ROM unit plus $2,000 (equivalent to $4,200 in 2025) fee for authoring tools, and some halting their existing efforts in protest. The magazine's exhaustive overview concluded with this: "QuickTime VR is an impressive achievement that reinforces Apple's role as the innovator in personal computer multimedia. But Apple's zeal to turn QuickTime VR into a profit center may slow its initial adoption and perhaps even relegate it to the backseat of Microsoft's limousine. As this issue went to press, Apple was reconsidering its requirement that developers pay royalties on titles that incorporate QuickTime VR. As well it should."

== Legacy ==
In 2016, Business Insider reflected on the long-term impact of QuickTime VR: "It's difficult not to read about Apple's experiments with panoramic images and not draw a connection to the recent rise of 360-degree videos on platforms like Facebook and YouTube — or even the immersive aspects of services like Google Maps Street View. Much of what's called VR these days isn't a full interactive environment, but is instead a descendant of the panoramic images that Apple pioneered."

== See also ==
- Free viewpoint television
- Virtual tour
- Photosynth
