= VR photography =

Interactive panoramic photo viewing format

360° panorama of a F-4F Phantom II cockpit (drag and drop to pan)

VR photography (after virtual-reality photography) is the interactive viewing of panoramic photographs, generally encompassing a 360-degree circle or a spherical view. The results is known as VR photograph (or VR photo), 360-degree photo (or 360° photo), photo sphere (or spherical photo), as well as spherical panorama, interactive panorama or immersive panorama.

VR photography is the art of capturing or creating a complete scene as a single image, as viewed when rotating about a single central position. Normally created by stitching together a number of photographs taken in a multi-row 360-degree rotation or using an omnidirectional camera, the complete virtual reality image can also be a totally computer-generated effect, or a composite of photography and computer generated objects. The history of VR photography is human-computer interaction in which a real or imaginary environment is simulated and users interact with and manipulate that world.

== Capture ==
There are several ways of capturing VR photography.

=== Rectilinear stitching ===
This involves the rotation of a digital camera, typically in the portrait (up and down) position and centered directly over the tripod. As the operator manually rotates the camera clockwise, the camera stops or clicks into a detent at regular intervals, such as every 30° of rotation. The rotator can be adjusted by changing the position of "detent ring or bolt," into another slot, to alter the interval of rotation: 40°, 60°, 90° etc.

If a given camera lens supports a wider view, one could select a larger detent value (for example, 60° instead of 30°). With a larger detent interval, fewer images are needed to capture a complete panoramic scene. The photographer may only need to take 6 shots as opposed to 10 shots to capture the same panorama. The combination of a precision rotator and a digital camera allows the photographer to take rectangular "slices" of any scene (indoors or outdoors). With a typical point and shoot digital camera, the photographer will snap 8, 10, 12 or 14 slices of a scene. Using specialized "photo stitching" software, the operator then assembles the "slices" into a single rectangular image, typically 4,500 pixels to 6,000 pixels wide. This technique, while extremely time-consuming, has remained popular even through today as the required equipment, rotator heads and software are relatively inexpensive and easy to learn. A stitched panoramic view is also called "cylindrical"—as the resulting stitched panorama allows panning in a complete 360°, but offers a limited vertical field of about 50° degrees above or below the horizon line.

=== Spherical stitching ===
This method requires the use of a "Fisheye lens" equipped digital SLR camera. The 2-shot fish eye camera system was made popular by IPIX in the mid-1990s and a two-shot rotator head that rotated and locked into 0° and 180° positions only. The camera was an Olympus or Nikon CoolPix camera and the lenses used were the Nikon FC-E8 or FC-E9 fish-eye lens. The IPiX 360 camera system enabled photographers to capture a full 360 X 360 floor to ceiling view of any scene with just 4 shots as opposed to the more time-consuming 8, 10, or 12-shot rectilinear produced panoramas described above. This type of virtual tour required more expensive virtual tour camera equipment including (for example) a Sigma 8mm f/3.5 lens which allowed photographers to set their rotator heads to 90° and capture a complete virtual tour of any scene in just 4 shots (0°, 90°, 180°, 270°).

=== Cubical stitching ===
This technique was one of the first forms of immersive, floor to ceiling virtual tours. Apple Computer pioneered this with the release of Apple's QuickTime VR in the early 1990s. Free utility software such as Cubic Converter and others allowed photographers to stitch and convert their panoramas into a "cube" like box to achieve a complete 360 X 360 view. Today, this technique is considered rather "old school," and spherical stitching has become more mainstream for producing these types of tours.

=== One-shot optics ===
Using one-shot panoramic optics one can create quick panoramic videos and images such as the type used on the iPhone.

=== Software ===
Various software products can be used to create virtual tours. While programs such as Adobe Photoshop have new features that allow users to stitch images together, they only support rectilinear types of stitching. Photoshop cannot produce them as quickly or accurately as stitching software programs can such as Autodesk Stitcher. This is because sophisticated math and camera-lens profiles are needed to create the desired panorama image which is based on the camera's Field Of View (FOV) and the type of lens used. Cameras such as the Nikon D3 or D700 have a full frame digital SLR whereas the Nikon D90 or Canon T2i (Rebel line of Digital EOS cameras) have a smaller sensor. When full frame digital SLR cameras are used with a fish eye lens such as a Sigma 8mm F/3.5, a full circular image is captured. This allows you to shoot 2 or 3 shots per view to create a 360 X 360 stitched panoramic image. When used with a non full frame digital SLR camera like the Nikon D90 or Canon digital Rebel and similar cameras, 4-shots are required with the camera in the portrait position. The resulting image will have the left and right sides cropped off each of the 4 images and each of the four corners, creating a rounded image.

=== Hardware ===
==== Cameras with one lens ====
These models are used with a fisheye lens. The lens bends the angle of the shot to take a larger radius of the selected subject. It is not possible to take a complete 360-degree picture with this technique because there is always a dead angle directly behind the lens.

==== Cameras with two lenses ====
360-degree cameras with two lenses are probably the most common type, as they can accommodate a full 360-degree angle with two lenses facing each other. A camera takes pictures and videos with an angle of just over 180 degrees, e.g. 220 degrees. These are then converted into a 360-degree object using software. Problems are often caused by stitching errors. This means that an incorrect combination of the images can result in an unclean cut edge that is difficult or impossible to remove.

==== Cameras with multiple lenses ====
Depending on the application, manufacturers use more than two camera lenses to produce the images. One of the first cameras was the throwing camera "Panono". It has 36 cameras, which are triggered at the same time at the highest point, if the camera was thrown into the air. The more lenses are installed in the camera, the more difficult it becomes for the software to combine the individual images. The possible stitching problems are less with a good stitching.

==== Camera rigs ====
Camera rigs are mostly used for the attachment of 6 conventional Actioncams. GoPro produced one of the first camera rigs. They are available in different versions and connect several single cameras. The cameras are placed in this cube and record the surroundings in all directions.

==== Mosaic based cameras ====
If several "normal" cameras are combined in a network, one speaks of mosaic-based cameras. Each of these cameras records a small area of the environment. The individual images are then joined like mosaic stones to form an omnidirectional overall image. The number of cameras to be used depends on the focal length of the lenses used. The smaller the focal length, the larger the angle of view and the fewer cameras are required.

== Display ==
QuickTime VR (QTVR) was the original interactive panorama format, with Apple's QuickTime software acting as the viewer. Recent versions of Microsoft Windows and Microsoft Photos also provide built-in support via the .pano file extension. There are also a growing number of different players and plug-ins. Many of these have been based on Flash, Java, SilverLight, and custom programming using OpenGL and WebGL, but 360 player development is now largely based in HTML5 and JavaScript.

== Applications ==
VR photography can also be used for displaying objects in 360, commonly referred to as 360 product photography among other names. These are created by capturing a series of images as the object rotates over a 360 rotation (camera stays in a fixed position). The output will be a series of individual images (typically JPG format) that can then be composed into an interactive 360 view, typically using HTML5 and JavaScript. 360 Object VR is commonly used in ecommerce.

360° street-level imagery or simply street-level imagery are captured with cameras mounted on moving cars or carried by pedestrians, often geotagged based on a GPS device (bult-in the camera or external). Several websites display this type of imagery, such as Google Street View.

== See also ==
- Image stitching
- IPIX
- Volumetric video
