= Red-eye effect =

Photography appearance

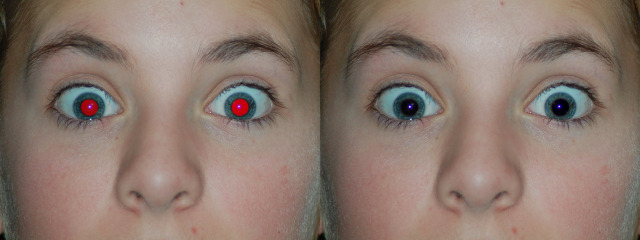
A demonstration of red-eye correction

The red-eye effect in photography is the common appearance of red pupils in color photographs of eyes. It occurs when using a photographic flash at low lighting or at night. When a flash passes through the eyes and rebounds at the back of the eye, it causes a red reflex in an image, turning the subject's eyes red. The hue is mostly caused by a high concentration of blood in the choroid. The effect can also be influenced by the near proximity of the flash and camera lens. In children, a different hue red reflex, such as white or yellow, may indicate an illness. In animals, a similar effect could cause their eyes to change colors in photographs.

The effect can be avoided physically by instructing the subject to look away from the lens, increasing the brightness of the photographic location, or moving the flash further away from the lens, or digitally by using the red-eye correction option on digital cameras or by removing the effect in editing software. Scholars have developed a number of red-eye detection techniques to improve digital red-eye removal.

== Causes ==
The red-eye effect occurs in the eyes of humans when a photography flash is used in low light or at night. The flash travels through the eyes and rebounds at the rear of the eye, turning the eyes red (red reflex) in a photograph. The main cause of the red color is the ample amount of blood in the choroid, which supports the back of the eye and lies behind the retina. Melanin also plays a role in the effect, as individuals with less melanin, such as those with albinism, reflect more light. The close distance of the flash to the camera lens can also have an impact, especially on cameras with built-in flash.

The effect could also infrequently occur in only one eye of persons with cataracts or tumors, or it may be exacerbated by photographing subjects that are drunk. In children, if the red reflex is white, it may indicate retinoblastoma malignancy, whereas yellow color may indicate Coats' disease. If the effect is asymmetrical, it may indicate strabismus. A similar reaction to the red-eye occurs in animals, turning their eyes different colors.

== Prevention ==
Either physical or digital manipulation of the effect is possible. The subject can turn away from the camera lens, the flash can be mounted on a hot shoe or bracket, or the lighting can be increased to make the subject's pupils more constricted. The effect could potentially be avoided by positioning the flash off the side of the camera or by pointing it away from the subject and toward a white solid surface to bounce the flash off of it. The subject could also be photographed near a bright light source or in sunlight. To lessen the effect, the photographer might alternatively employ the fill flash technique.

Cameras with red-eye prevention modes can reduce or eliminate the effect by shining a bright light or firing a number of pre-flashes shortly before a photograph is taken, to cause the subject's pupils to contract.

== Correction ==
The effect can be removed digitally in-camera by using red-eye correction. Editing software can eliminate the effect.

Scholars have proposed a number of red-eye detection methods for digital red-eye correction. The red-eye detection algorithm developed by electronic engineers Seunghwan Yoo and Rae-Hong Park is composed of face detection, region growing, and red-eye detection. Following the detection of the subject's face and eyes, the algorithm searches for red-eye regions, which are subsequently enlarged using the region-growing technique. They claim that pupil size calculation, pupil painting, and iris detection make up the red-eye correction that may then take place. Computer scientists Xiao-Ping Miao and Terence Sim have proposed their technique for detecting red-eye by fusing subjects' flash and non-flash photos. Scholars Tauseef Ali, Asif Khan, and Intaek Kim put forth an algorithm that, following facial recognition, grayscales the image before applying red-eye correction. On the contrary, researchers Richard Youmaran and Andy Adler presented a method for improving the quality of videos with the red-eye phenomenon. They have stated that their method consists of two frames, the first shot under standard illumination with no infrared light and the second one using infrared light.

== Sources ==
- Ali, Tauseef; Khan, Asif; Kim, Intaek (2009). "Automatic detection and correction of red-eye effect". 2009 2nd International Conference on Computer, Control and Communication. pp. 1–4. doi:10.1109/IC4.2009.4909192. ISBN 978-1-4244-3313-1.
- Bailey, Nina (17 May 2020). "Red Eye". EOS Magazine.
- Evans, Wendy (4 January 2025). "I'm a Portrait Expert, Here's How I Avoid the Red-Eye Effect Ruining My Photos". Digital Camera World.
- Johnson, Dave (16 January 2009). "How To: Avoid the Red Eye Effect". PC World. Archived from the original on 24 February 2010.
- Miao, Xiao-Ping; Sim, Terrence (2004). "Automatic red-eye detection and removal". 2004 IEEE International Conference on Multimedia and Expo (ICME) (IEEE Cat. No.04TH8763). Vol. 2. pp. 1195–1198. doi:10.1109/ICME.2004.1394434. ISBN 0-7803-8603-5.
- Mukamal, Reena (9 July 2024). "Photos Can Help Diagnose Children's Eye Problems and Save Sight". American Academy of Ophthalmology.
- Rodrigues, Aimee (27 February 2019). "How to Fix the Red Eye Effect in Photos". All About Vision.
- Yang, Bryan (12 May 2011). "What Causes the Red Eye Effect?". Yale Scientific Magazine.
- Yoo, Seunghwan; Park, Rae-Hong (August 2009). "Red-Eye Detection and Correction Using Inpainting in Digital Photographs". IEEE Transactions on Consumer Electronics. 55 (3): 1006–1014. doi:10.1109/TCE.2009.5277948.
- Youmaran, Richard; Adler, Andy (2006). "Using Red-Eye to Improve Face Detection in Low Quality Video Images". 2006 Canadian Conference on Electrical and Computer Engineering. pp. 1940–1943. doi:10.1109/CCECE.2006.277437. ISBN 1-4244-0038-4.
- "Retinoblastoma". NHS. 17 February 2014.
- "red-eye". Webster's Dictionary. 3 January 2025.
