= Color structure code =

Color segmentation method

The color structure code (CSC) is a color segmentation method that can operate on multiple processors.
