= Luminița Vese =

Romanian professor of mathematics

Luminița Aura Vese is a Romanian professor of mathematics at the University of California, Los Angeles, known for her research in image processing, including work on active contour models, level-set methods, image segmentation, and inpainting.

== Contributions ==
The Chan–Vese method of image segmentation using active contours is named after her and Tony F. Chan; Chan and Vese published the method in 2001.

The Vese–Osher and Osher–Solé–Vese models are optimization problems used for noise reduction of images, by decomposing an image into a sum of signal and noise in a way that optimizes a combination of measures of the smoothness of the image and the total amount of noise. They are again named after Vese, and her co-authors Stanley Osher and Andrés Solé on two papers published in 2003.

With Carole Le Guyader, Vese is the author of the book Variational Methods in Image Processing (CRC Press, 2016).

== Education and career ==
Vese earned bachelor's and master's degrees in 1992 at the West University of Timișoara in Romania. She then moved to the University of Nice Sophia Antipolis in France, earning a second master's degree in 1992 and completing her doctorate in 1997. Her dissertation, Problèmes variationnels et EDP pour l’analyse d’image et l’évolution des courbes, was jointly supervised by Gilles Aubert and Michel Rascle. After taking a temporary position at Paris Dauphine University, she joined the University of California, Los Angeles faculty in 2000. She received a Sloan Research Fellowship in 2003.
