= Split and merge segmentation =

Split and merge segmentation is an image processing technique used to segment an image. The image is successively split into quadrants based on a homogeneity criterion and similar regions are merged to create the segmented result. The technique incorporates a quadtree data structure, meaning that there is a parent-child node relationship. The total region is a parent, and each of the four splits is a child.

== Algorithm ==
- Define the criterion to be used for homogeneity
- Split the image into equal size regions
- Calculate homogeneity for each region
- If the region is homogeneous, then merge it with neighbors
- The process is repeated until all regions pass the homogeneity test

== Homogeneity ==
After each split, a test is necessary to determine whether each new region needs further splitting. The criterion for the test is the homogeneity of the region. There are several ways to define homogeneity, some examples are:

- Uniformity- the region is homogeneous if its gray scale levels are constant or within a given threshold.
- Local mean vs global mean - if the mean of a region is greater than the mean of the global image, then the region is homogeneous
- Variance - the gray level variance is defined as

$\sigma^2 = (1/(N-1))\sum_{(r,c)\epsilon R}[I(r,c)-\bar{I}] ^2$

where r and c are row and column, N is the number of pixels in the region and $\bar{I}=(1/N)\sum_{(r,c)\epsilon Region}I(r,c)$

An example incorporation would be that the variance of a region be less than a specified value in order to be considered homogeneous.

== Data structure ==
The splitting results in a partitioned image as shown below to 3 levels.

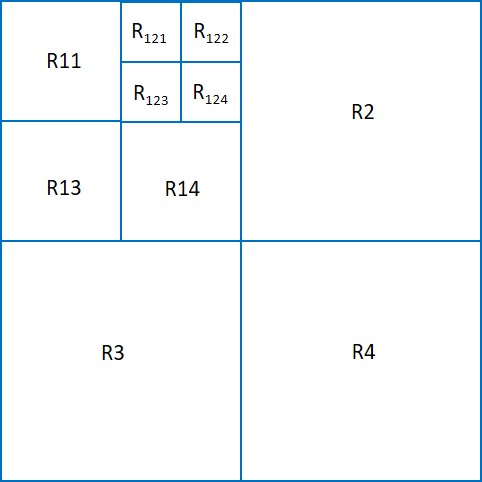

Each level of partitioning can be represented in a tree-like structure.

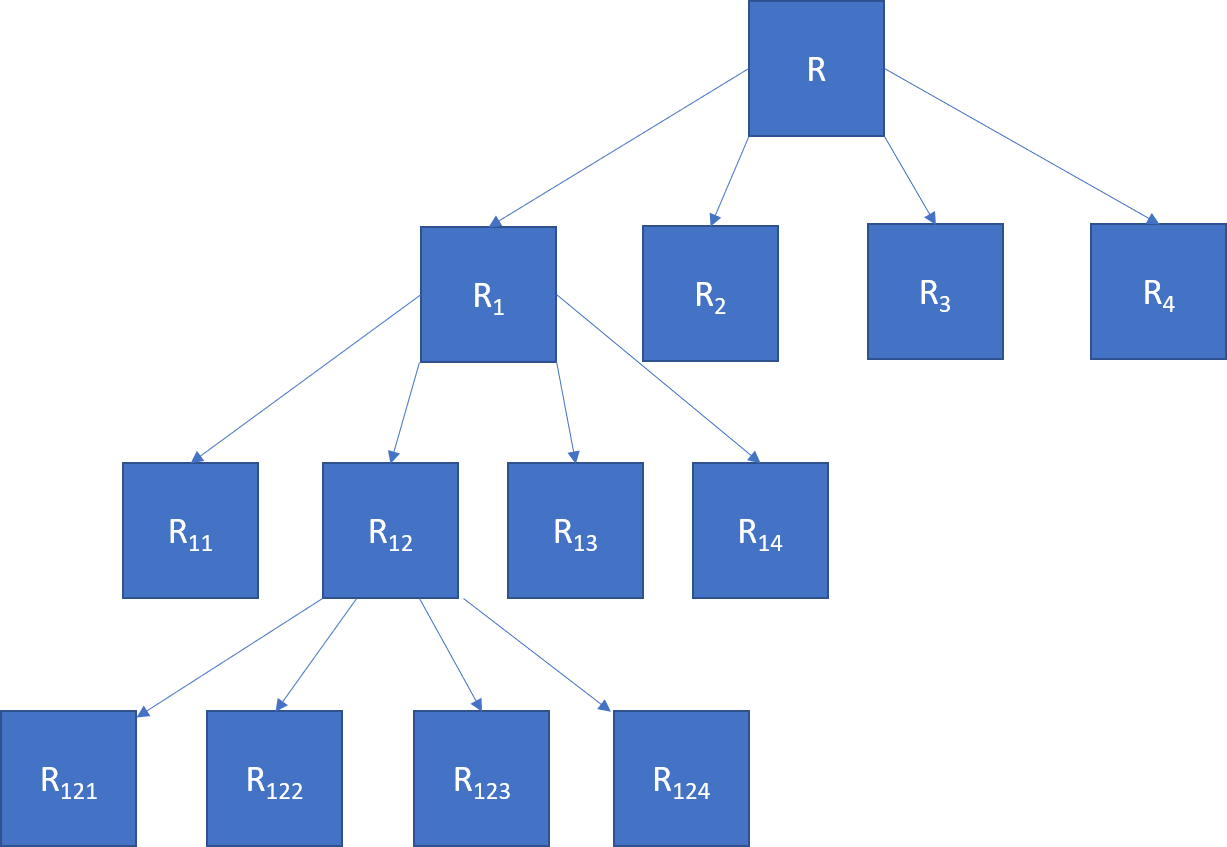

== Example ==
The following example shows the segmentation of a gray scale image using matlab. The homogeneity criterion is thresholding, max(region)-min(region) < 10 for a region to be homogeneous.

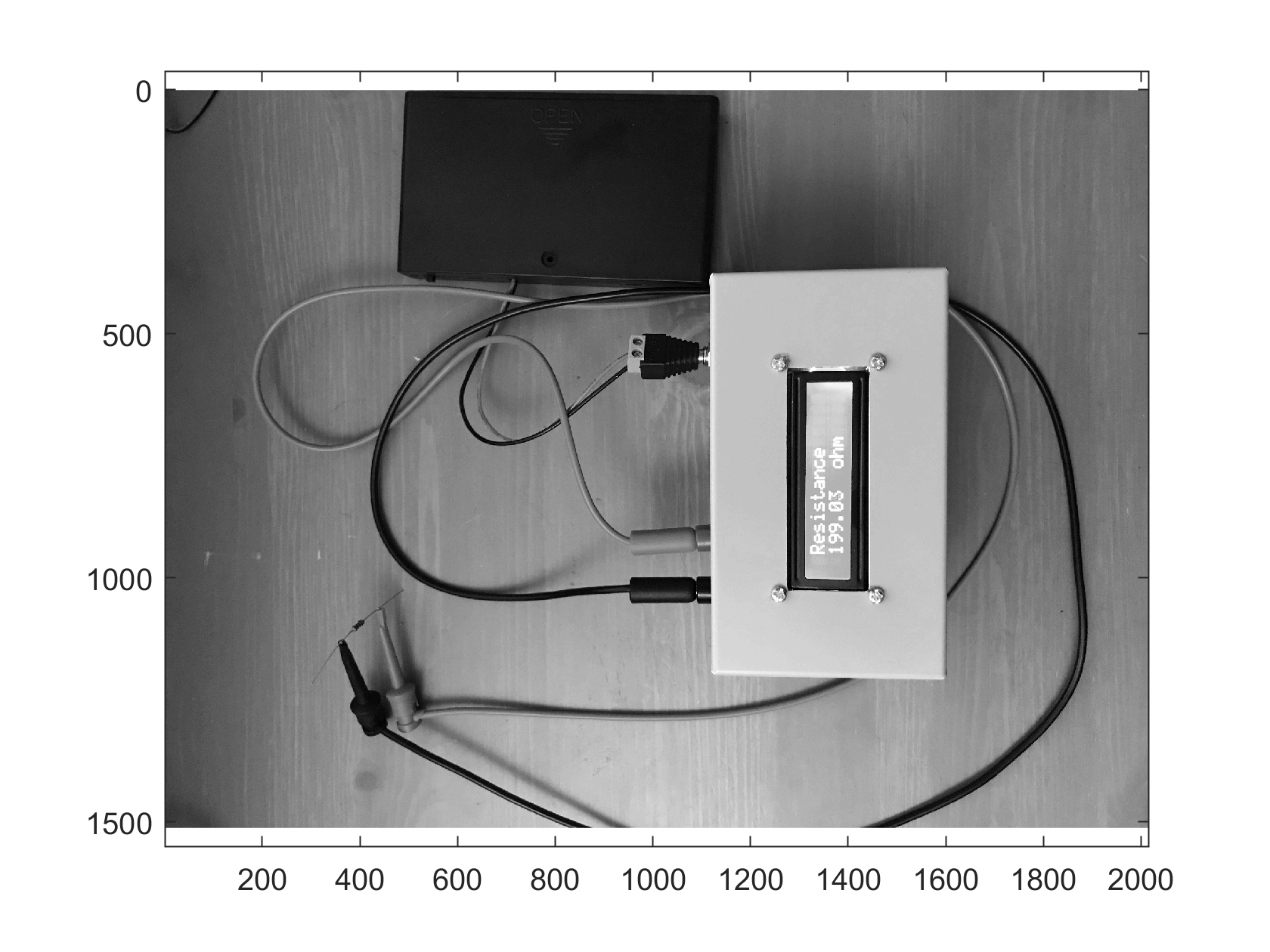

The blocks created during splitting are shown in the following picture:

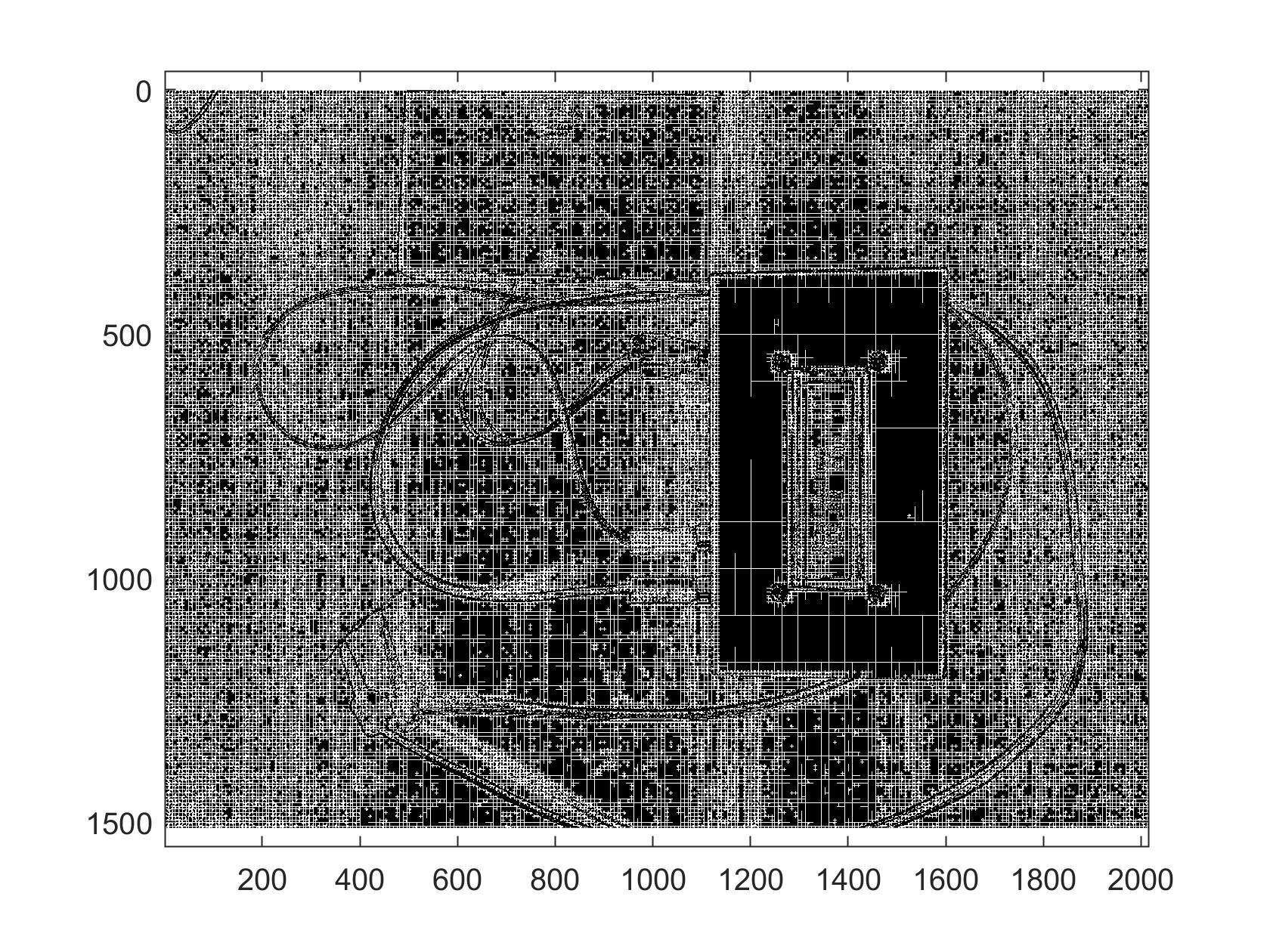

And the segmented image is below.

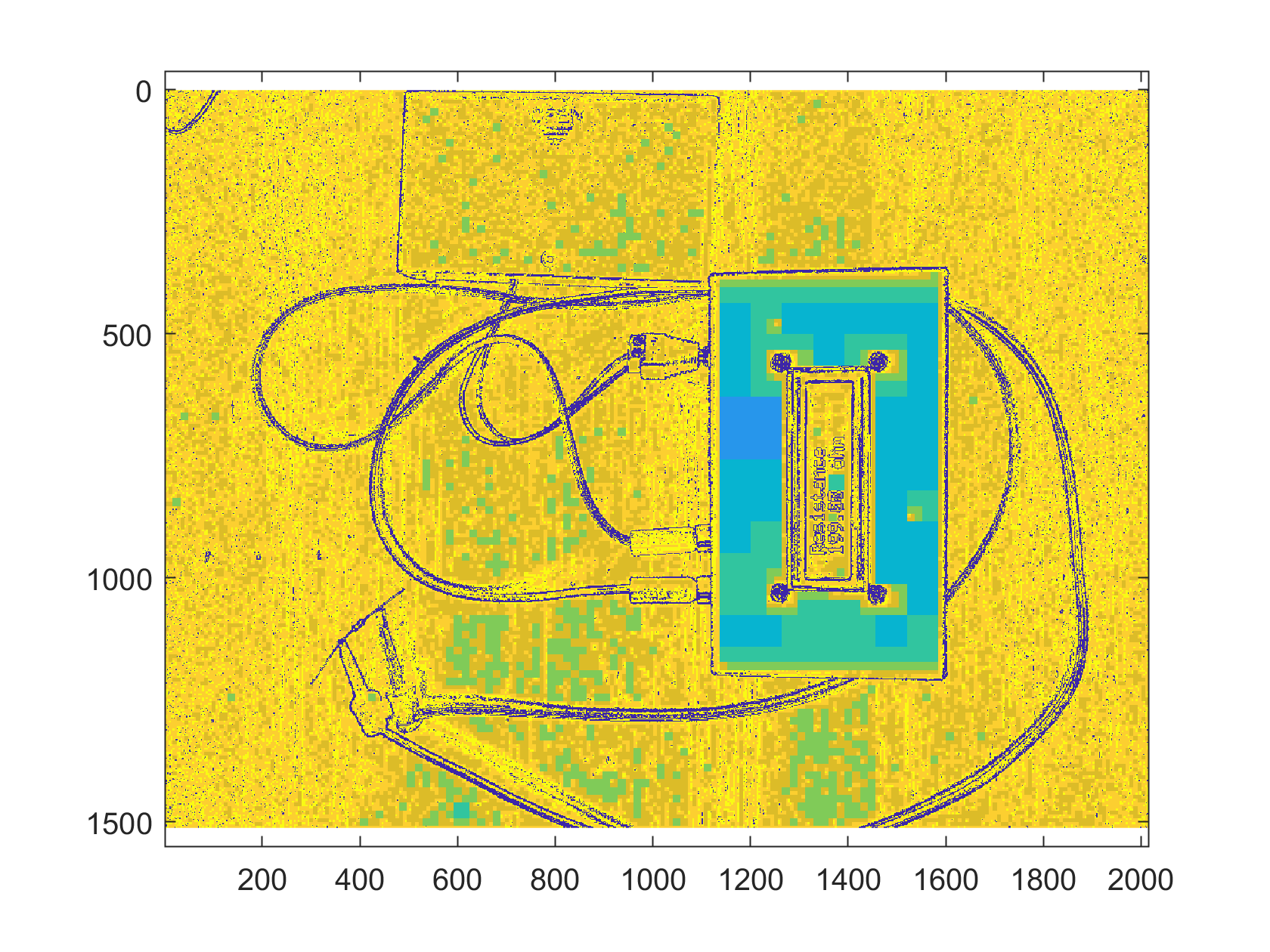

== Remarks ==
Split-and-merge segmentation is based on a quadtree partition of an image. It is sometimes called quadtree segmentation.

This method was formally described by S.L. Horowitz and T. Pavlidis in 1974. When a special data structure is involved in the implementation of the algorithm of the method, its time complexity can reach $O(n\log n)$, an optimal algorithm of the method.
