= Multispectral segmentation =

Scientific method

Multispectral segmentation is a method for differentiating tissue classes of similar characteristics in a single imaging modality using several independent images of the same anatomical slice in different modalities (e.g., T2, proton density, T1, etc.). This makes it easier to discriminate between different tissues, as each tissue responds differently to particular pulse sequences.

== See also ==
- Magnetic resonance imaging
