= Balanced histogram thresholding =

Type of image thresholding

In image processing, the balanced histogram thresholding method (BHT), is a very simple method used for automatic image thresholding. Like Otsu's Method and the Iterative Selection Thresholding Method, this is a histogram based thresholding method. This approach assumes that the image is divided in two main classes: The background and the foreground. The BHT method tries to find the optimum threshold level that divides the histogram in two classes.

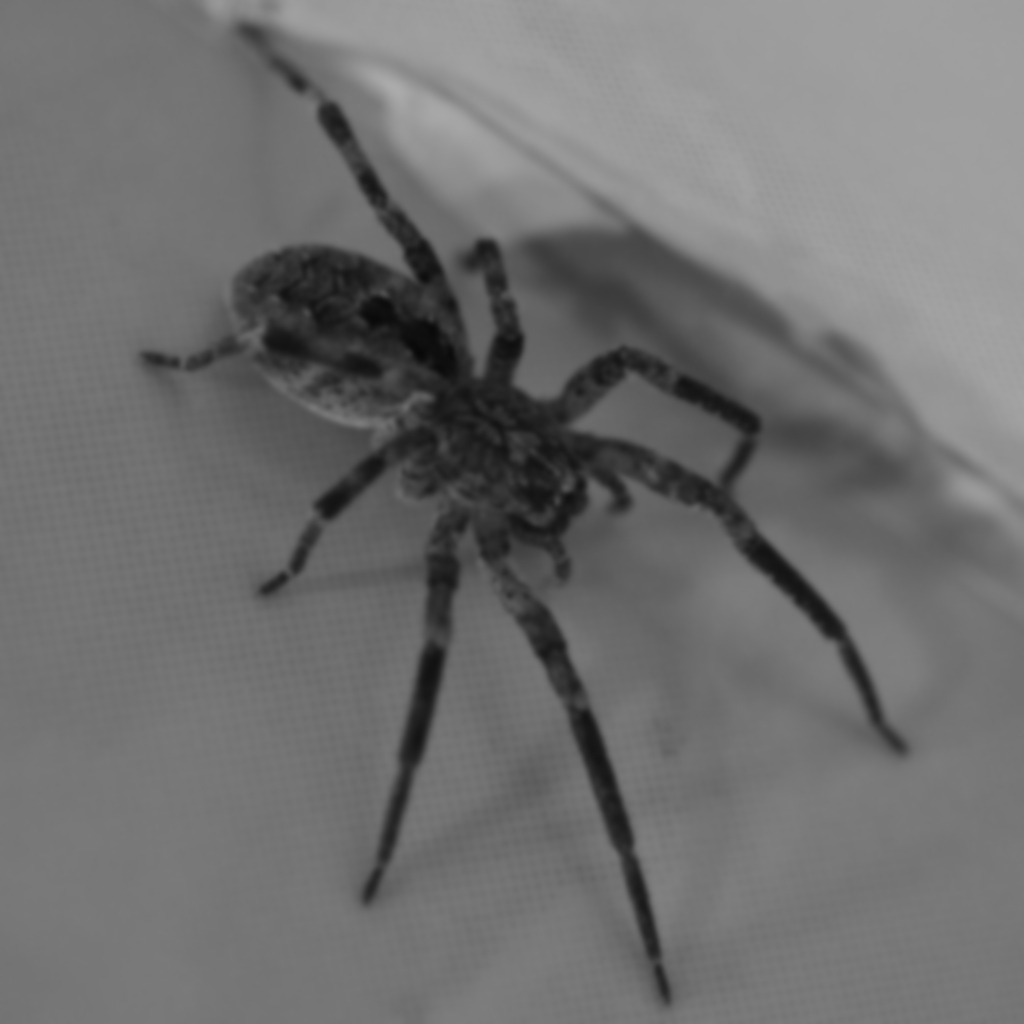
Original image.

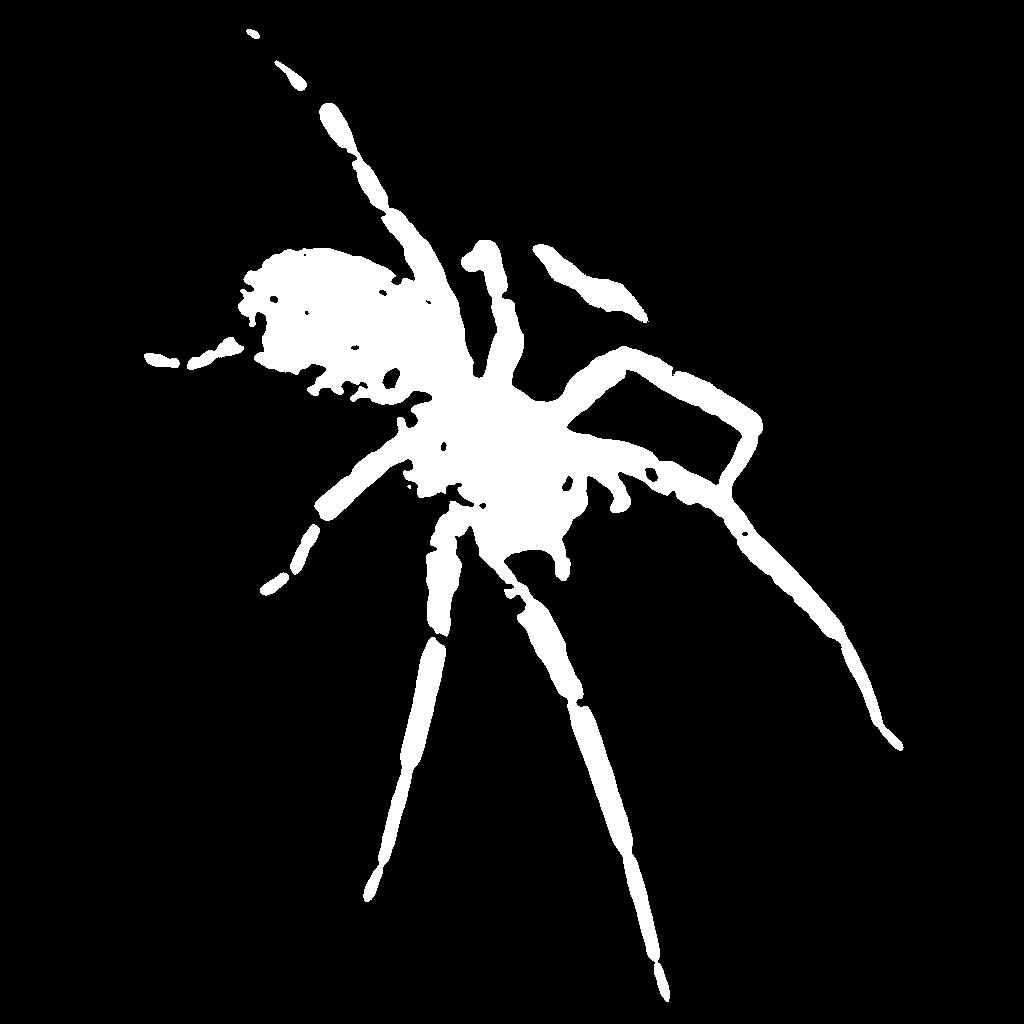
Thresholded image.

Evolution of the method.

This method weighs the histogram, checks which of the two sides is heavier, and removes weight from the heavier side until it becomes the lighter. It repeats the same operation until the edges of the weighing scale meet.

Given its simplicity, this method is a good choice as a first approach when presenting the subject of automatic image thresholding.

== Algorithm ==
The following listing, in C notation, is a simplified version of the Balanced Histogram Thresholding method:

int BHThreshold(int[] histogram) {
    i_m = (int)((i_s + i_e) / 2.0f); // center of the weighing scale I_m
    w_l = get_weight(i_s, i_m + 1, histogram); // weight on the left W_l
    w_r = get_weight(i_m + 1, i_e + 1, histogram); // weight on the right W_r
    while (i_s <= i_e) {
        if (w_r > w_l) { // right side is heavier
            w_r -= histogram[i_e--];
            if (((i_s + i_e) / 2) < i_m) {
                w_r += histogram[i_m];
                w_l -= histogram[i_m--];
            }
        } else if (w_l >= w_r) { // left side is heavier
            w_l -= histogram[i_s++]; 
            if (((i_s + i_e) / 2) >= i_m) {
                w_l += histogram[i_m + 1];
                w_r -= histogram[i_m + 1];
                i_m++;
            }
        }
    }
    return i_m;
}

The following, is a possible implementation in the Python language:

def balanced_histogram_thresholding(histogram, minimum_bin_count: int = 5, jump: int = 1) -> int:
    """
    Determines an optimal threshold by balancing the histogram of an image, 
    focusing on significant histogram bins to segment the image into two parts.

    Args:
        histogram (list): The histogram of the image as a list of integers, 
                          where each element represents the count of pixels 
                          at a specific intensity level.
        minimum_bin_count (int): Minimum count for a bin to be considered in the 
                                 thresholding process. Bins with counts below this 
                                 value are ignored, reducing the effect of noise.
        jump (int): Step size for adjusting the threshold during iteration. Larger values 
                    speed up convergence but may skip the optimal threshold.

    Returns:
        int: The calculated threshold value. This value represents the intensity level 
             (i.e. the index of the input histogram) that best separates the significant
             parts of the histogram into two groups, which can be interpreted as foreground
             and background. 
             If the function returns -1, it indicates that the algorithm was unable to find 
             a suitable threshold within the constraints (e.g., all bins are below the 
             minimum_bin_count).
    """
    # Find the start and end indices where the histogram bins are significant
    start_index = 0
    while start_index < len(histogram) and histogram[start_index] < minimum_bin_count:
        start_index += 1
    
    end_index = len(histogram) - 1
    while end_index >= 0 and histogram[end_index] < minimum_bin_count:
        end_index -= 1

    # Check if no valid bins are found
    if start_index >= end_index:
        return -1  # Indicates an error or non-applicability

    # Initialize threshold
    threshold = (start_index + end_index) // 2

    # Iteratively adjust the threshold
    while start_index <= end_index:
        # Calculate weights on both sides of the threshold
        weight_left = sum(histogram[start_index:threshold])
        weight_right = sum(histogram[threshold:end_index + 1])

        # Adjust the threshold based on the weights
        if weight_left > weight_right:
            start_index += jump
        elif weight_left < weight_right:
            end_index -= jump
        else:  # Equal weights; move both indices
            start_index += jump
            end_index -= jump

        # Calculate the new threshold
        threshold = (start_index + end_index) // 2

    return threshold
