= Closed-circuit television =

Video camera system with a limited set of receivers

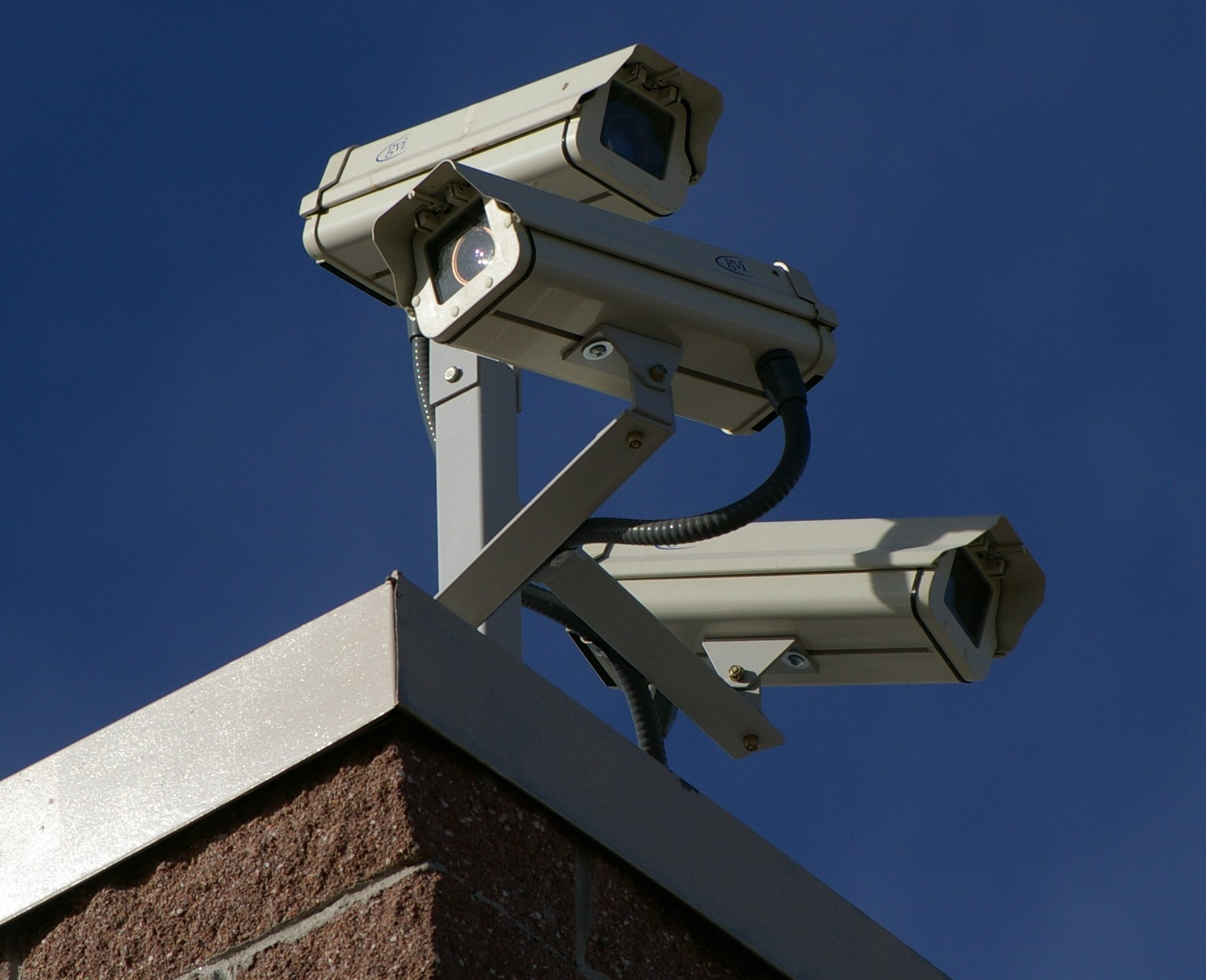
Surveillance cameras on the corner of a building

Closed-circuit television (CCTV), also known as video surveillance, is the use of closed-circuit television cameras to transmit a signal to a specific place on a limited set of monitors. It differs from broadcast television in that the signal is not openly transmitted, though it may employ point-to-point, point-to-multipoint (P2MP), or mesh wired or wireless links. Even though almost all video cameras fit this definition, the term is most often applied to those used for surveillance in areas that require additional security or ongoing monitoring (videotelephony is seldom called "CCTV").

The deployment of this technology has facilitated significant growth in state surveillance, a substantial rise in methods of advanced social monitoring and control, and a host of crime prevention measures throughout the world. Though surveillance of the public using CCTV cameras is common in many areas around the world, video surveillance has generated significant debate about balancing its use with individuals' right to privacy even when in public.

In industrial plants, CCTV camera equipment may be used to observe parts of a process from a central control room, especially if the environments observed are dangerous or inaccessible to humans. CCTV systems may operate continuously or only as required to monitor a particular event. A more advanced form of CCTV, using digital video recorders (DVRs), provides recording for possibly many years, with a variety of quality and performance options and extra features (such as motion detection and email alerts). More recently, decentralized IP cameras, some equipped with megapixel sensors, support recording directly to network-attached storage devices or internal flash storage for stand-alone operation.

== History ==
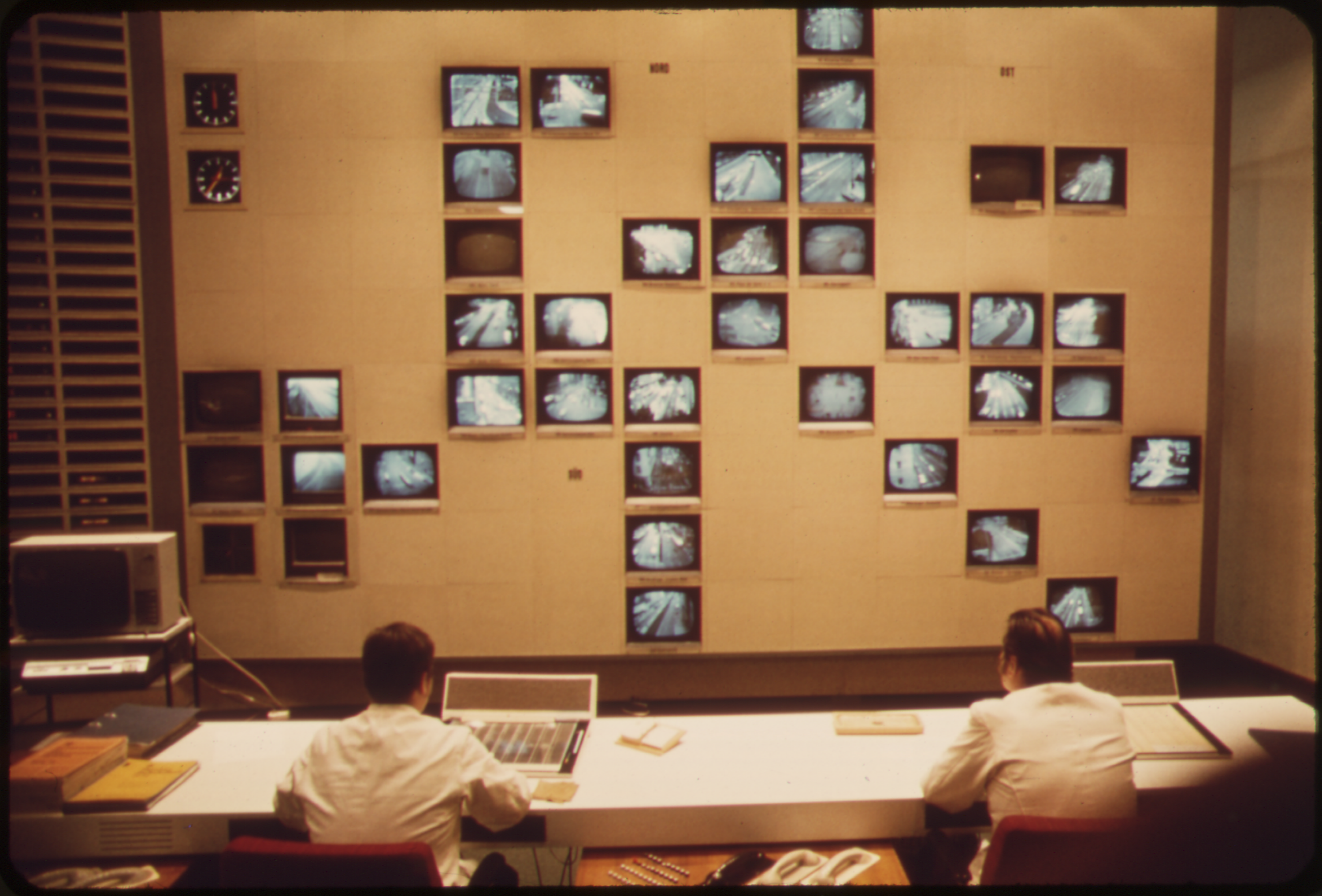
CCTV monitoring at the Central Police Control Station, Munich, Germany, in 1973

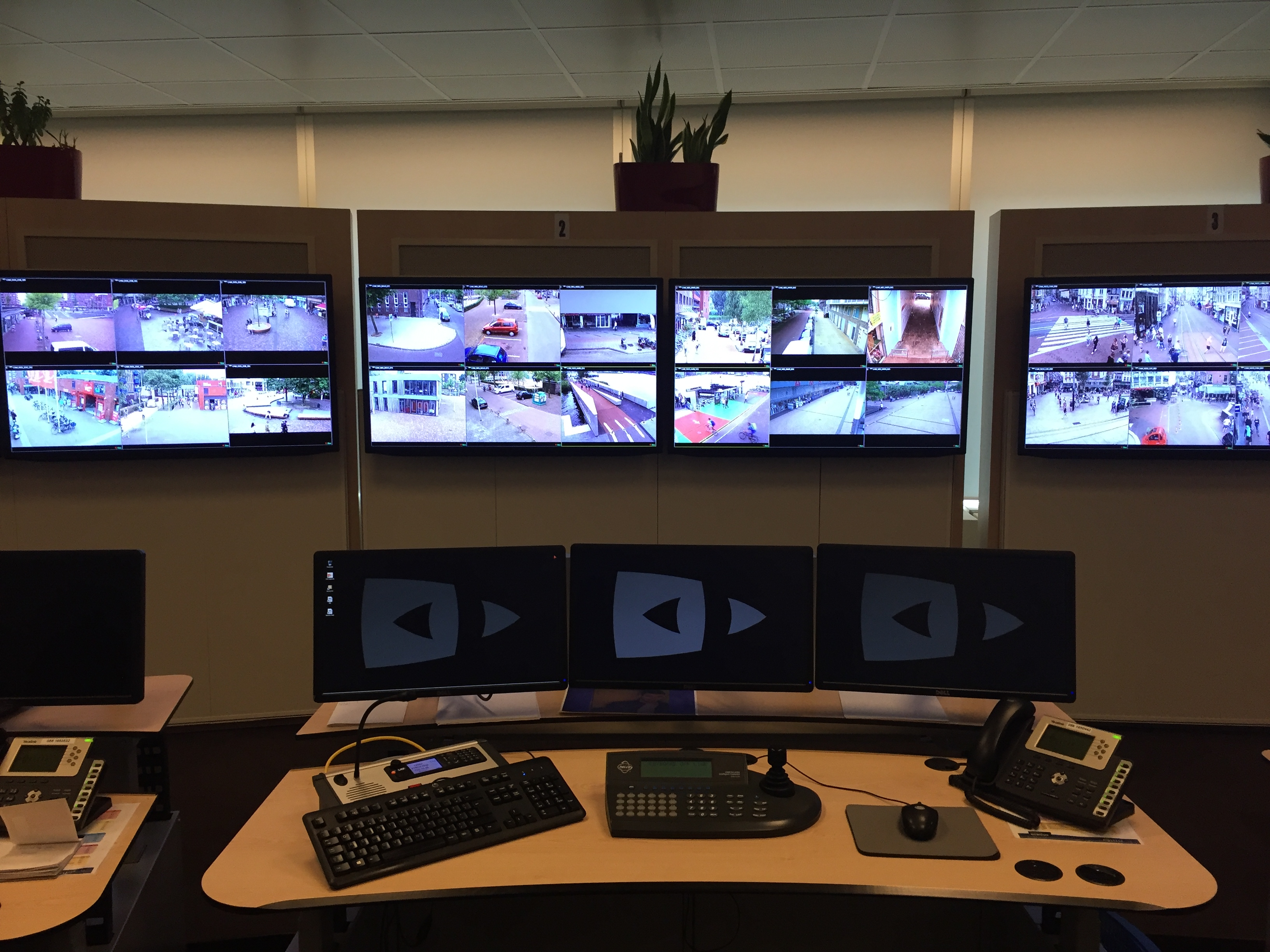
Desk in one of the regional control-rooms of the National Police in the Netherlands in 2017

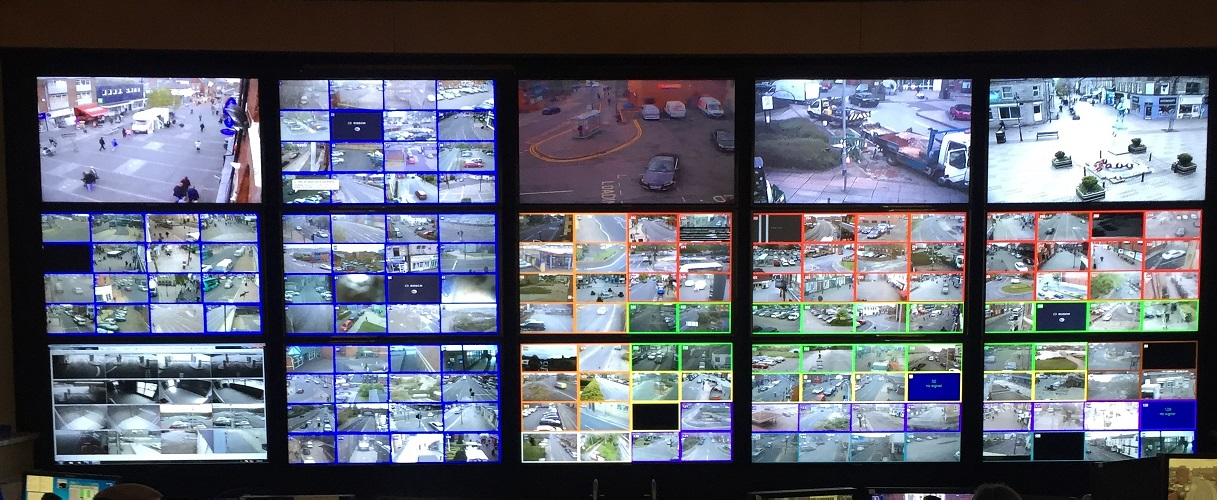
CCTV control-room monitor wall for 176 open-street cameras in 2017

An early mechanical CCTV system was developed in June 1927 by Russian physicist Leon Theremin. Originally requested by CTO (the Soviet Council of Labor and Defense), the system consisted of a manually operated scanning-transmitting camera and wireless shortwave transmitter and receiver, with a resolution of a hundred lines. Having been commandeered by Kliment Voroshilov, Theremin's CCTV system was demonstrated to Joseph Stalin, Semyon Budyonny, and Sergo Ordzhonikidze, and subsequently installed in the courtyard of the Moscow Kremlin to monitor approaching visitors.

Another early CCTV system was installed by Siemens at Test Stand VII in Peenemünde, Nazi Germany, in 1942, for observing the launch of V-2 rockets.

In the United States, the first commercial closed-circuit television system became available in 1949 from Remington Rand and designed by CBS Laboratories, called "Vericon". Vericon was advertised as not requiring a government permit due to the system using cabled connections between camera and monitor rather than over-the-air transmission. In 1951, the University of Kansas was the first university in the world to permanently install a color CCTV system into its medical school operating rooms, enhancing surgical training. The system was developed by Remington Rand, CBS and the Wilmot Castle Company.

=== Technology ===
The earliest video surveillance systems involved constant monitoring because there was no way to record and store information. The development of reel-to-reel media enabled the recording of surveillance footage. These systems required magnetic tapes to be changed manually, with the operator having to manually thread the tape from the tape reel through the recorder onto a take-up reel. Due to these shortcomings, video surveillance was not widespread.

Later, videocassette recorder technology became available in the 1970s, making it easier to record and erase information, and the use of video surveillance became more common. During the 1990s, digital multiplexing was developed, allowing several cameras to record at once, as well as time-lapse and motion-only recording. This saved time and money which then led to an increase in the use of CCTV. The first Internet based CCTV recording service was introduced commercially in the early 2000s and this also led to the first time CCTV could be viewed on a mobile phone in 2003. Since then, CCTV technology has been shifting towards Internet-based products and systems, and other technological developments. Following the launch of the iPhone in 2007 and the subsequent improvements in mobile bandwidth, remote viewing via mobile gradually became a common feature of CCTV systems.

=== Application ===
Early CCTV systems were installed in central London by the Metropolitan Police between 1960 and 1965. By 1963, CCTV was being used in Munich to monitor traffic. Closed-circuit television was used as a form of pay-per-view theatre television for sports such as professional boxing and professional wrestling, and from 1964 through 1970, the Indianapolis 500 automobile race. Boxing telecasts were broadcast live to a select number of venues, mostly theaters, with arenas, stadiums, schools, and convention centres also being less often used venues, where viewers paid for tickets to watch the fight live. The first fight with a closed-circuit telecast was Joe Louis vs. Jersey Joe Walcott II in 1948.

Closed-circuit telecasts peaked in popularity with Muhammad Ali in the 1960s and 1970s, with "The Rumble in the Jungle" fight drawing 50 million CCTV viewers worldwide in 1974, and the "Thrilla in Manila" drawing 100 million CCTV viewers worldwide in 1975. In 1985, the WrestleMania I professional wrestling show was seen by over one million viewers with this scheme. As late as 1996, the Julio César Chávez vs. Oscar De La Hoya boxing fight had 750,000 viewers. Although closed-circuit television was gradually replaced by pay-per-view home cable television in the 1980s and 1990s, it is still in use today for most awards shows and other events that are transmitted live to most venues but do not air as such on network television, and later re-edited for broadcast.

In September 1968, Olean, New York, was the first city in the United States to install CCTV video cameras along its main business street in an effort to fight crime. Marie Van Brittan Brown received a patent for the design of a CCTV-based home security system in 1969. (U.S. patent 3,482,037). Another early appearance was in 1973 in Times Square in New York City. The NYPD installed it to deter crime in the area; however, crime rates did not appear to drop much due to the cameras. Nevertheless, during the 1980s, video surveillance began to spread across the country specifically targeting public areas. It was seen as a cheaper way to deter crime compared to increasing the size of the police departments. Some businesses as well, especially those that were prone to theft, began to use video surveillance. From the mid-1990s on, police departments across the country installed an increasing number of cameras in various public spaces including housing projects, schools, and public parks. CCTV later became common in banks and stores to discourage theft by recording evidence of criminal activity. In 1997, 3,100 CCTV systems were installed in public housing and residential areas in New York City.

Experiments in the UK during the 1970s and 1980s, including outdoor CCTV in Bournemouth in 1985, led to several larger trial programs later that decade. The first use by local government was in King's Lynn, Norfolk, in 1987.

== Uses ==
=== Crime prevention ===
The two-year-old James Bulger being led away by his killers, recorded on shopping centre CCTV in 1993; this narrow-bandwidth television system had a low frame rate

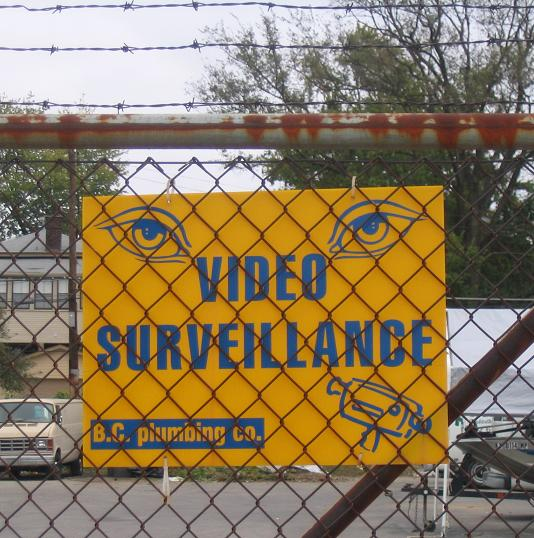
Sign warning that premises are watched by CCTV cameras

A 2008 report by UK Police Chiefs concluded that only 3% of crimes were solved by CCTV. In London, a Metropolitan Police report showed that in 2008 only one crime was solved per 1000 cameras. In some cases CCTV cameras have become a target of attacks themselves. A 2009 systematic review by researchers from Northeastern University and the University of Cambridge used meta-analytic techniques to pool the average effect of CCTV on crime across 41 different studies. The studies included in the meta-analysis used quasi-experimental evaluation designs that involved before-and-after measures of crime in experimental and control areas. However, researchers have argued that the British car park studies included in the meta-analysis cannot accurately control for the fact that CCTV was introduced simultaneously with a range of other security-related measures. Second, some have noted that, in many of the studies, there may be issues with selection bias since the introduction of CCTV was potentially endogenous to previous crime trends. In particular, the estimated effects may be biased if CCTV is introduced in response to crime trends.

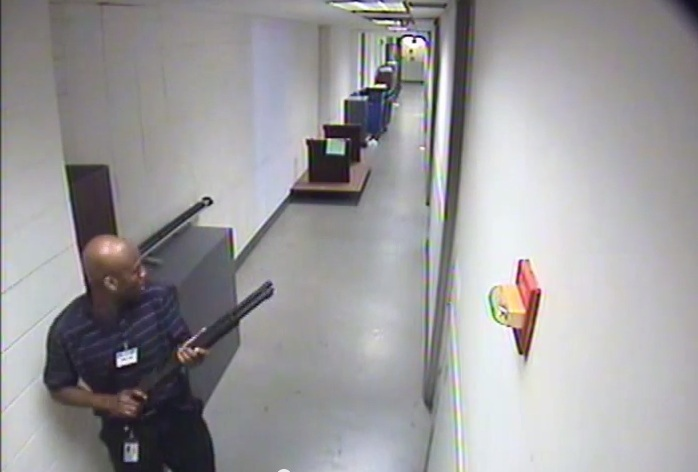
A CCTV captured the perpetrator of the Washington Navy Yard shooting, Aaron Alexis, during his rampage

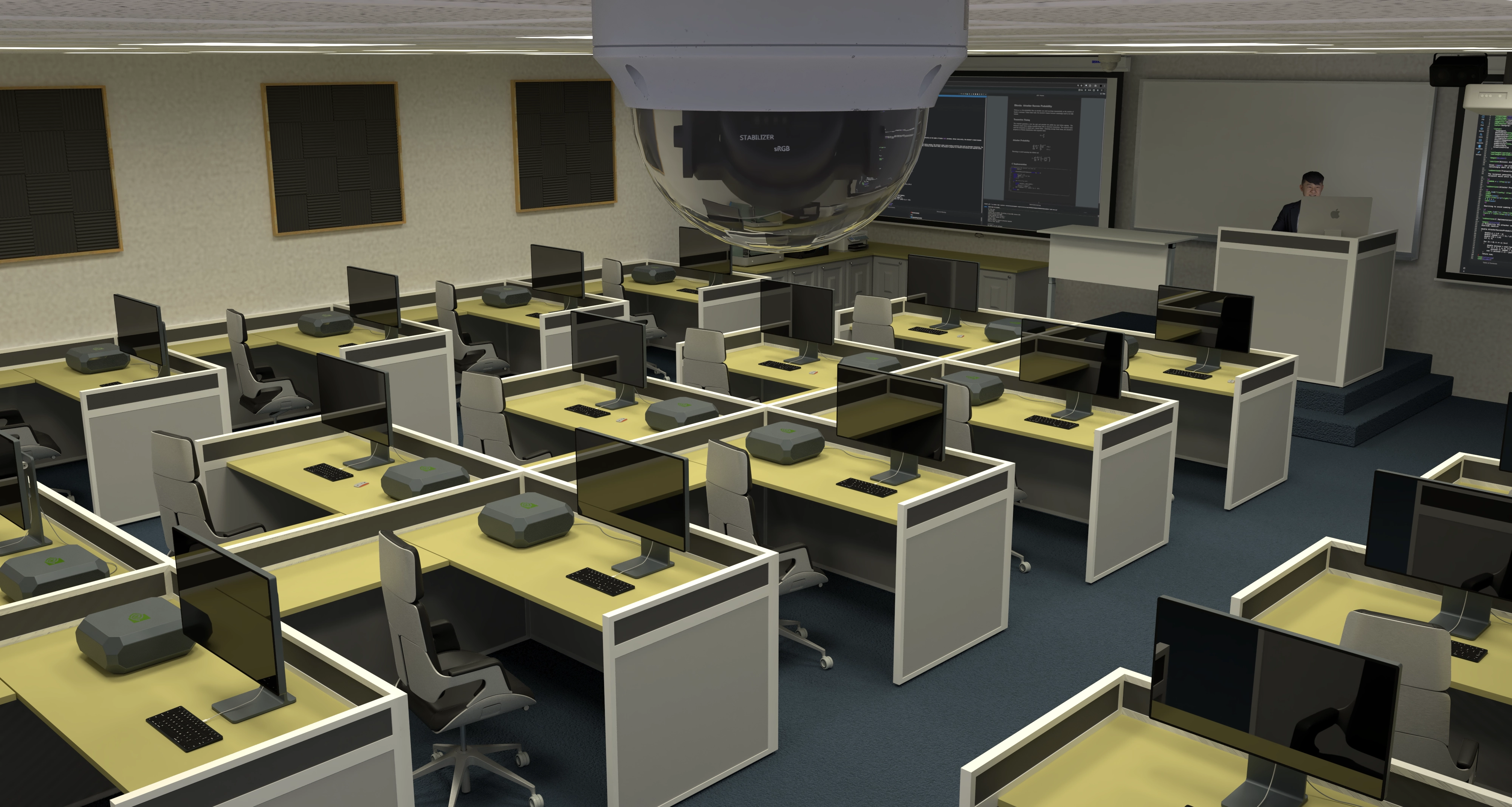
3D design of a classroom security camera

In 2012, cities such as Manchester in the UK are using DVR-based technology to improve accessibility for crime prevention. In 2013, City of Philadelphia Auditor found that the $15 million system was operational only 32% of the time. There is anecdotal evidence that CCTV aids in detection and conviction of offenders; for example, UK police forces routinely seek CCTV recordings after crimes. Cameras have also been installed on public transport in the hope of deterring crime.

A 2017 review published in the Journal of Scandinavian Studies in Criminology and Crime Prevention compiles seven studies that use such research designs. The studies found that CCTV reduced crime by 24–28% in public streets and urban subway stations. It also found that CCTV could decrease unruly behaviour in football stadiums and theft in supermarkets/mass merchant stores. However, there was no evidence of CCTV having desirable effects in parking facilities or suburban subway stations. Furthermore, the review indicates that CCTV is more effective in preventing property crimes than in violent crimes. However, a 2019, 40-year-long systematic review study reported that the most consistent effects of crime reduction of CCTV were in car parks.

A more open question is whether most CCTV is cost-effective. While low-quality domestic kits are cheap, the professional installation and maintenance of high definition CCTV is expensive. Gill and Spriggs did a cost-effectiveness analysis (CEA) of CCTV in crime prevention that showed little monetary saving with the installation of CCTV as most of the crimes prevented resulted in little monetary loss. Critics however noted that benefits of non-monetary value cannot be captured in a traditional cost effectiveness analysis and were omitted from their study.

In October 2009, an "Internet Eyes" website was announced which would pay members of the public to view CCTV camera images from their homes and report any crimes they witnessed. The site aimed to add "more eyes" to cameras which might be insufficiently monitored. Civil liberties campaigners criticized the idea as "a distasteful and a worrying development". Russia has also implemented a video surveillance system called 'Safe City', which has the capability to recognize facial features and moving objects, sending the data automatically to government authorities. However, the widespread tracking of individuals through video surveillance has raised significant privacy issues.

==== Forensics ====
Material collected by surveillance cameras has been used as a tool in post-event forensics to identify tactics and perpetrators of terrorist attacks. Furthermore, there are various projects—such as INDECT—that aim to detect suspicious behaviours of individuals and crowds. It has been argued that terrorists will not be deterred by cameras, that terror attacks are not really the subject of the current use of video surveillance and that terrorists might even see it as an extra channel for propaganda and publication of their acts. In Germany, calls for extended video surveillance by the country's main political parties, SPD, CDU, and CSU have been dismissed as "little more than a placebo for a subjective feeling of security" by a member of the Left party.

In Singapore, since 2012, thousands of CCTV cameras have helped deter loan sharks, nab litterbugs, and stop illegal parking, according to government figures. In 2013, Oaxaca, Mexico, hired deaf police officers to lip read conversations to uncover criminal conspiracies.

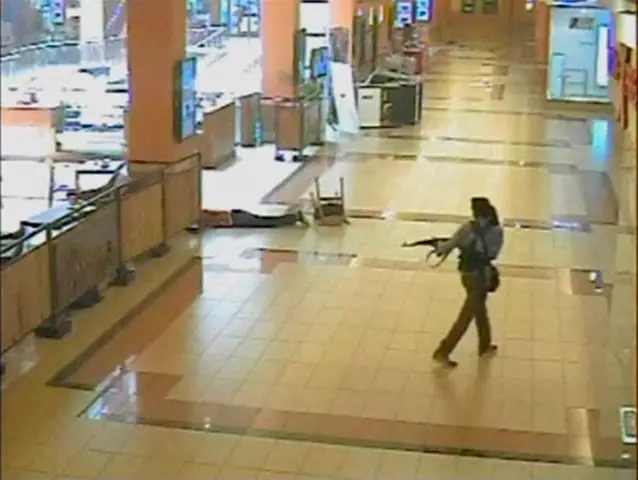
Omar Nabhan, as seen on CCTV during the Westgate shopping mall attack that resulted in the deaths of 71 people. Authorities observed the attack via the cameras within the mall.

=== Body-worn cameras ===
In recent years, the use of body-worn video cameras has been introduced for a number of uses. For example, as a new form of surveillance in law enforcement, there are surveillance cameras that are worn by the police officer and are usually located on a police officer's chest or head. According to the Bureau of Justice Statistics (BJS), in the United States, in 2016, about 47% of the 15,328 general-purpose law enforcement agencies had acquired body-worn cameras.

=== Traffic flow monitoring ===
Many cities and motorway networks have extensive traffic-monitoring systems. Many of these cameras however, are owned by private companies and transmit data to drivers' GPS systems.

Highways England has a publicly owned CCTV network of over 3000 pan–tilt–zoom cameras covering the British motorway and trunk road network. These cameras are primarily used to monitor traffic conditions and are not used as speed cameras. With the addition of fixed cameras for the active traffic management system, the number of cameras on the Highways England's CCTV network is likely to increase significantly over the next few years. The London congestion charge is enforced by cameras positioned at the boundaries of and inside the congestion charge zone, which automatically read the number plates of vehicles that enter the zone. If the driver does not pay the charge then a fine will be imposed. Similar systems are being developed as a means of locating cars reported stolen. Other surveillance cameras serve as traffic enforcement cameras.

In Mecca, Saudi Arabia, CCTV cameras are used for monitoring (and thus managing) the flow of crowds. In the Philippines, barangay San Antonio used CCTV cameras and artificial intelligence software to detect the formation of crowds during an outbreak of a disease. Security personnel were sent whenever a crowd formed at a particular location in the city.

=== Use in homes and buildings ===
==== In schools ====
Surveillance video of the 2022 Andover tornado as it passed by a school. Several cameras in and outside of the building captured the event.

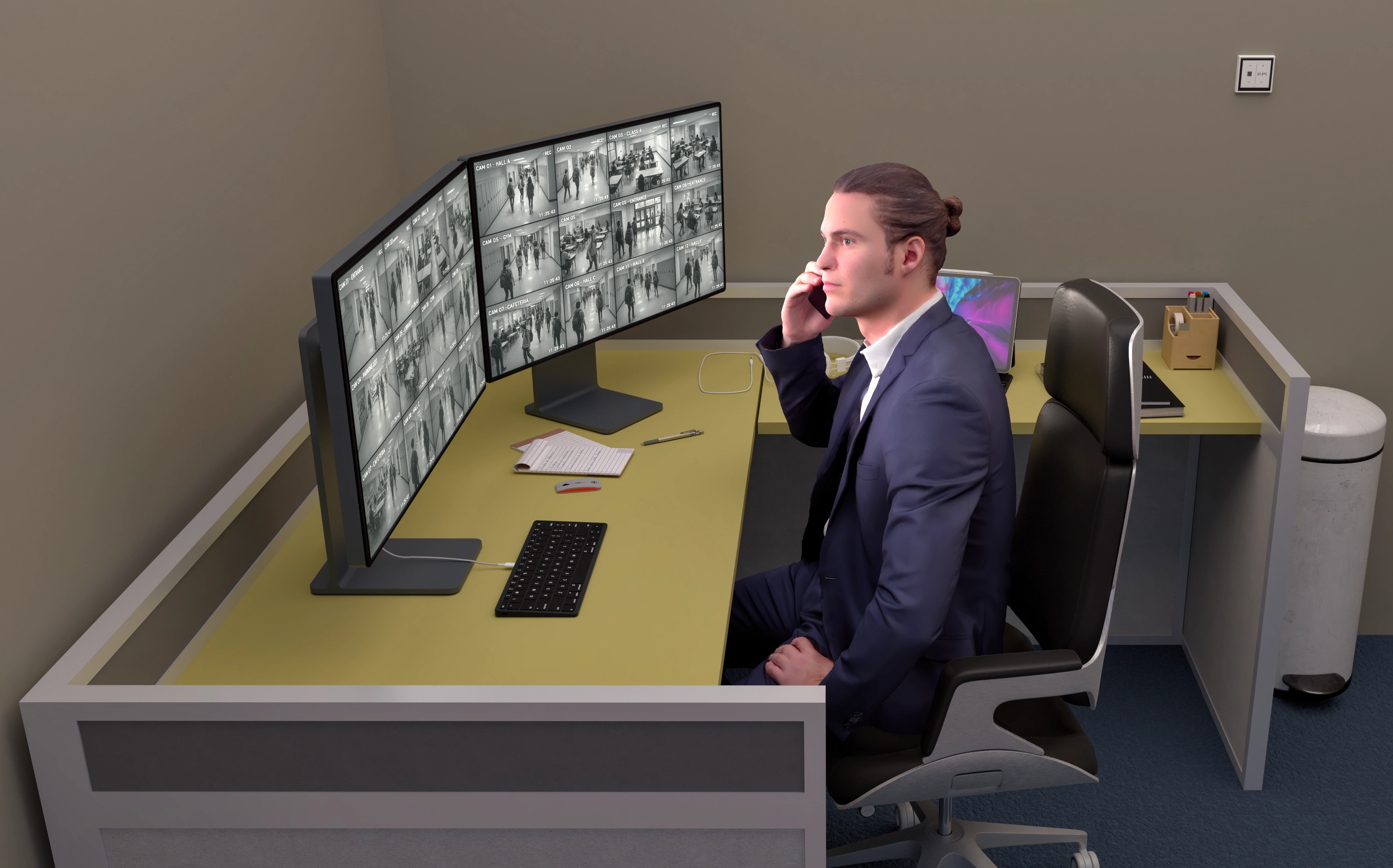
3D design of security camera monitoring for school security

In the United States, Britain, Canada, Australia, and New Zealand, CCTV is widely used in schools to prevent bullying, vandalism, monitoring visitors, and maintaining a record of evidence of a crime. There are some restrictions: cameras are not typically installed in areas where there is a "reasonable expectation of privacy", such as bathrooms, gym locker areas, and private offices. Cameras are generally acceptable in parking lots, cafeterias, and supply rooms. Though some teachers object to the installation of cameras. A study of high school students in Israeli schools shows that students' views on CCTV used in school are based on how they think of their teachers, school, and authorities. It also stated that most students do not want CCTV installed inside a classroom.

==== In private and public places ====
Many homeowners choose to install CCTV systems either inside or outside their own homes, sometimes both. Modern CCTV systems can be monitored through mobile phone apps with internet coverage. Some systems also provide motion detection, so when movement is detected, an alert can be sent to a phone.

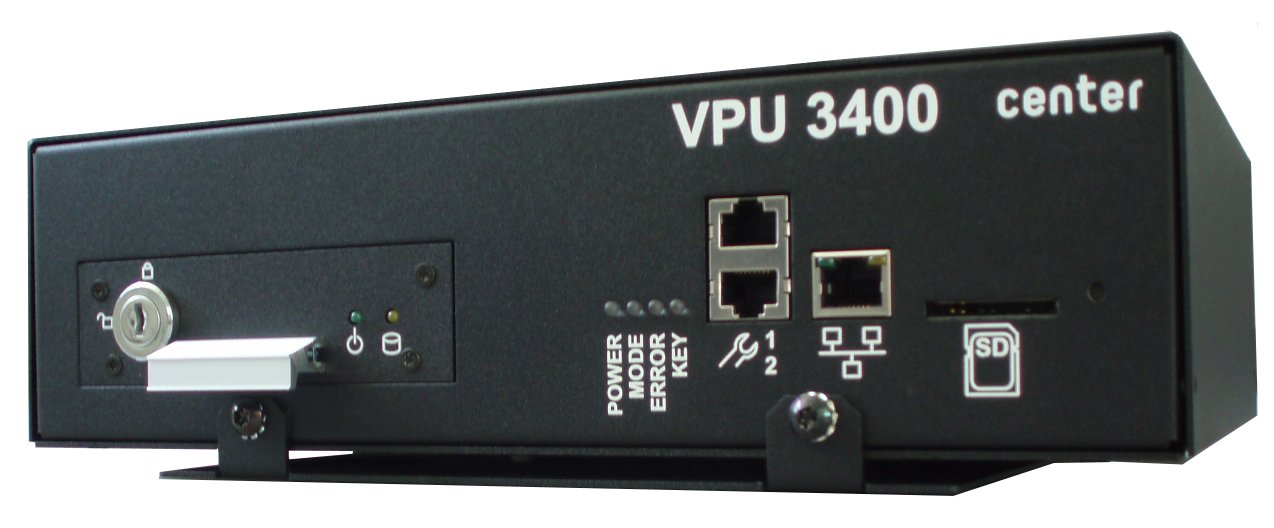
Digital video recorder for public transport

On a driver-only operated train, CCTV cameras may allow the driver to confirm that people are clear of doors before closing them and starting the train. A trial by RET in 2011 with facial recognition cameras mounted on trams made sure that people who were banned from them did not sneak on anyway. CCTV has also been frequently operated in many department stores and shopping malls to mitigate concerns of potential theft. In some countries, malls must obtain approval from the Ministry of Interior (MOI) or Information Commissioner's Office (ICO) before installing CCTVs. Some organizations also use CCTV to monitor the actions of workers in a workplace.

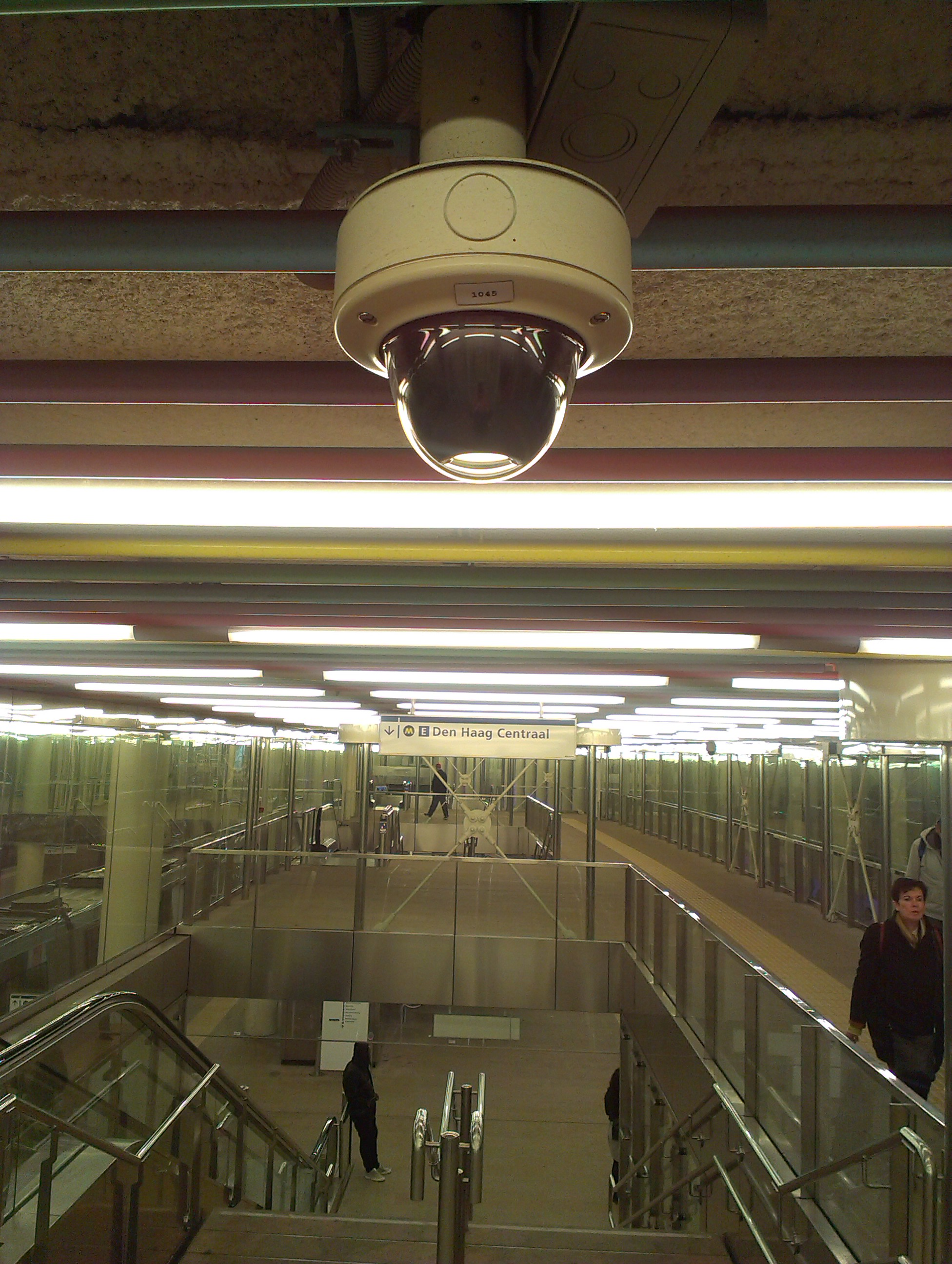
Dome camera in Rotterdam central metro station

Many sporting events in the United States use CCTV inside the venue, either to display on the stadium or arena's scoreboard or in the concourse or restroom areas to allow people to view action outside the seating bowl. The cameras send the feed to a central control centre where a producer selects feeds to send to the television monitors that people can view. In a trial with CCTV cameras, football club fans no longer needed to identify themselves manually, but could pass freely after being authorized by the facial recognition system.

=== Criminal use ===
Criminals may use surveillance cameras to monitor the public. For example, a hidden camera at an ATM can capture people's PINs as they are entered without their knowledge. The devices are small enough not to be noticed, and are placed where they can monitor the keypad of the machine as people enter their PINs. Images may be transmitted wirelessly to the criminal. Even lawful surveillance cameras sometimes have their data received by people who have no legal right to receive it.

== Prevalence ==
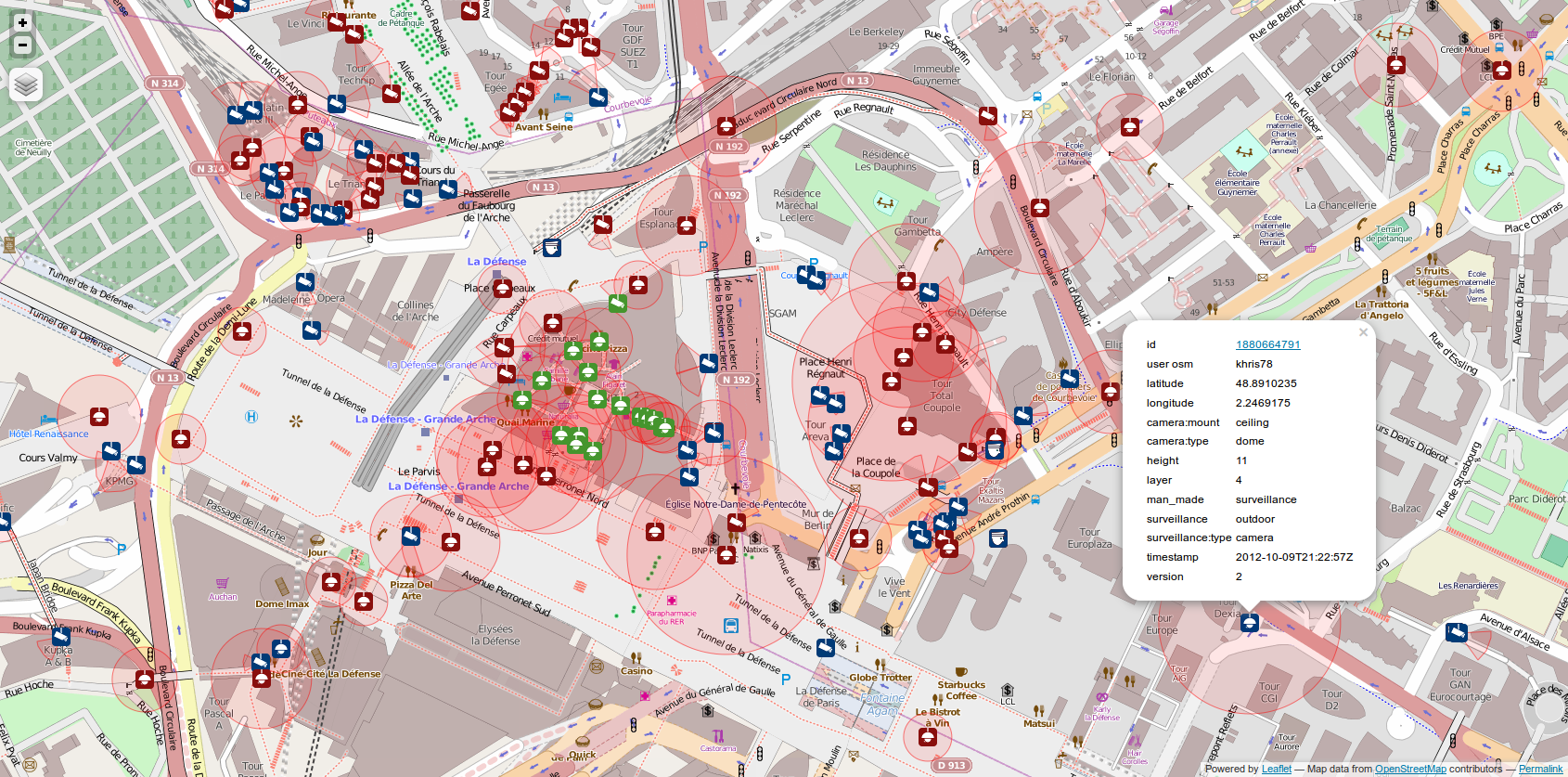
A crowdsourced map of CCTV cameras near Grande Arche, Paris, using OpenStreetMap data

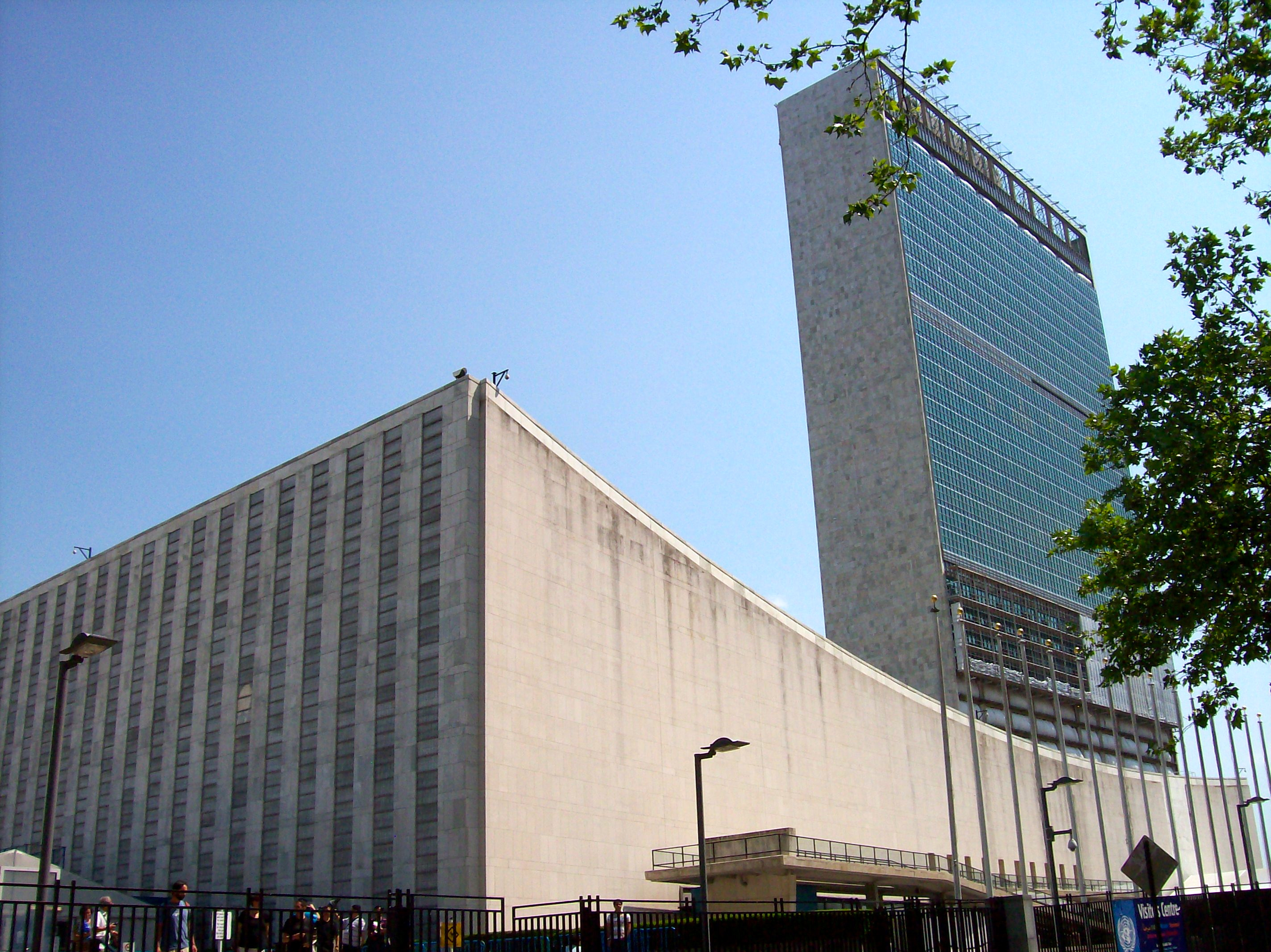
The headquarters of the United Nations in New York, with cameras visible on the side of the UN General Assembly Building

=== In Asia ===
About 65% of CCTV cameras in the world are installed in Asia. In Asia, different human activities attracted the use of surveillance camera systems and services, including but not limited to business and related industries, transportation, sports, and care for the environment. China and India have some of the highest-density and the most CCTVs in cities.

In 2018, China was reported to have over 170 million CCTV cameras. In 2023, China was estimated to have a surveillance network of around 540–626 million surveillance cameras, though numbers differ significantly between sources. Beijing, China's capital city, has the most cameras for a city overall, with a total of 1.15 million installed. The cameras are used to record details such as gender, age, and ethnicity. Cameras have been used in a southern Chinese city to issue tickets to people for infractions. In December 2024, Hong Kong police stated that they are planning to install up to 7,000 surveillance cameras across Hong Kong in roughly three years time, up from the estimated 600 installed cameras in 2024; this amounts to roughly 2,000 planned cameras every year starting from 2025. Earlier, in June 2024, security officials stated their intention to integrate facial recognition supported by artificial intelligence. The plan has been criticized for its similarity to the surveillance network in mainland China, and for further narrowing the gap in governance between Hong Kong and the mainland. In Japan, an estimation by Nikkei Business estimated that the total number of security cameras in Japan is approximately 5 million in 2018. In Singapore, it was estimated that the total number of CCTVs was around 90,000 in 2021.

In India, the cities of Hyderabad and Delhi, the capital, have around 900,000 and 450,000 cameras, respectively. The city of Chennai has the highest density per area of CCTV cameras worldwide, with 657 cameras per square kilometer in 2020 (from 280,000 CCTVs).

A CCTV captures the 2025 Shandong factory explosion

South Korea's military has removed over 1,300 surveillance cameras from its bases after it was discovered that the South Korean company who installed them had purchased them from a Chinese manufacturer. The footage gathered by the cameras was stored on a "specific Chinese server"; however, South Korean officials stated that no data had been leaked.

=== In the Americas ===
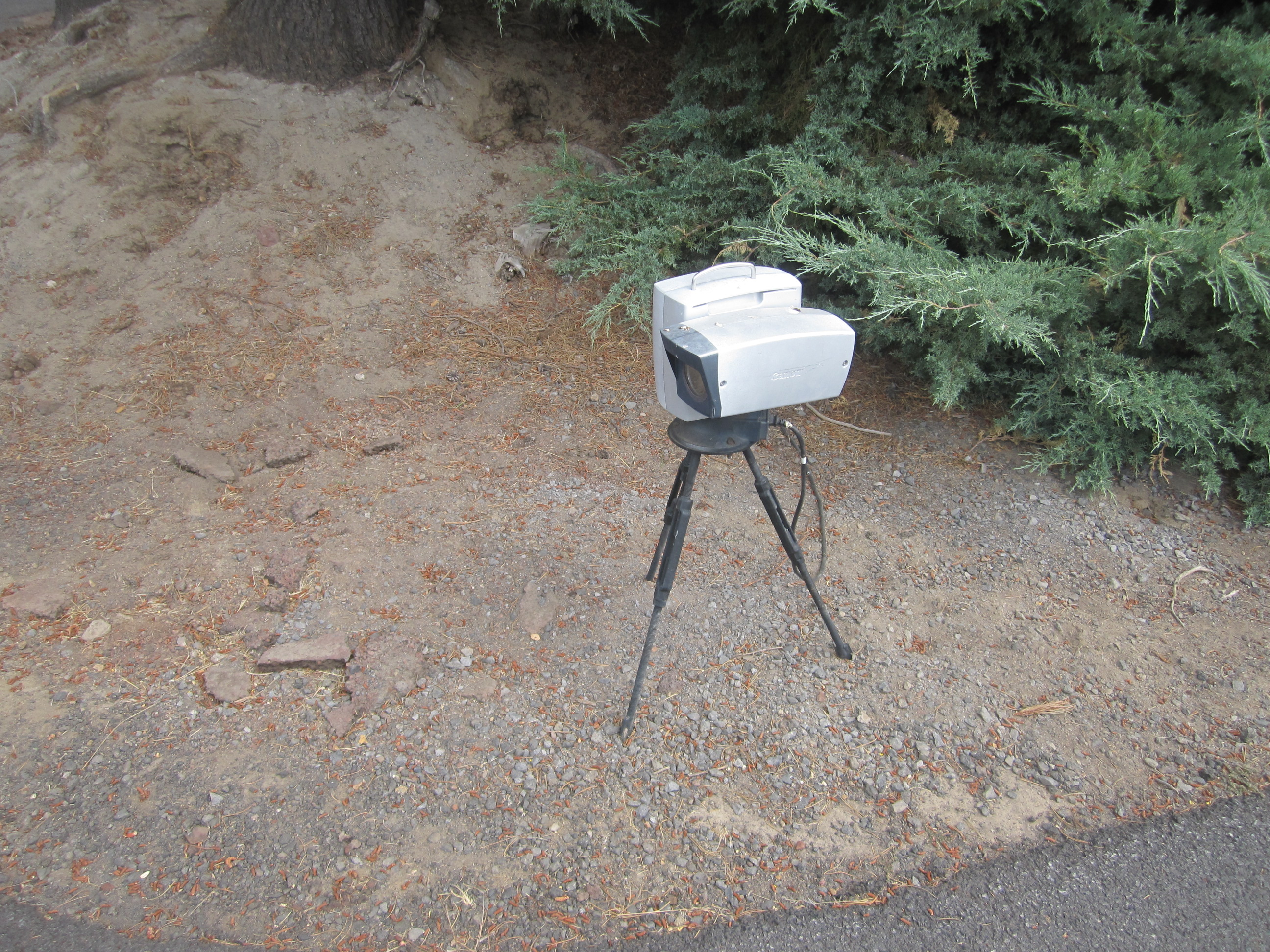
Surveillance camera mounted on a tripod in Sunriver, Oregon

In 2009, there were an estimated 15,000 CCTV systems in Chicago, many linked to an integrated camera network. New York City's Domain Awareness System has 6,000 video surveillance cameras linked together, there are over 4,000 cameras on the subway system (although nearly half of them do not work), and two-thirds of large apartment and commercial buildings use video surveillance cameras. In Washington, D.C., there are more than 30,000 surveillance cameras in schools, and the Metro has nearly 6,000 cameras in use across the system.

There were an estimated 30 million surveillance cameras in the United States in 2011. Video surveillance has been common in the United States since the 1990s; for example, one manufacturer reported net earnings of $120 million in 1995. With lower cost and easier installation, sales of home security cameras increased in the early 21st century. Following the September 11 attacks, the use of video surveillance in public places became more common to deter future terrorist attacks. Under the Homeland Security Grant Program, government grants are available for cities to install surveillance camera networks. In 2018, there are approximately 70 million surveillance cameras in the United States.

In Canada, Project SCRAM is a policing effort by the Canadian policing service Halton Regional Police Service to register and help consumers understand privacy and safety issues related to the installations of home security systems. The project service has not been extended to commercial businesses.

In Latin America, the CCTV market is growing rapidly with the increase of property crime. In Brazil, CCTV usage is only permitted in public areas, though individuals must be informed about the presence of the camera according to the Brazilian LGPD (which broadly aligns with the EU's GDPR), the Brazilian Civil Code, and the Brazilian Association of Technical Standards. However, starting in 2023, in Brazil, the Smart Sampa project, a project that plans to deploy 20,000 facial recognition cameras by 2024, has been criticized for its potential to be "biased against Black individuals" and overall risks of data privacy.

=== In Russia ===
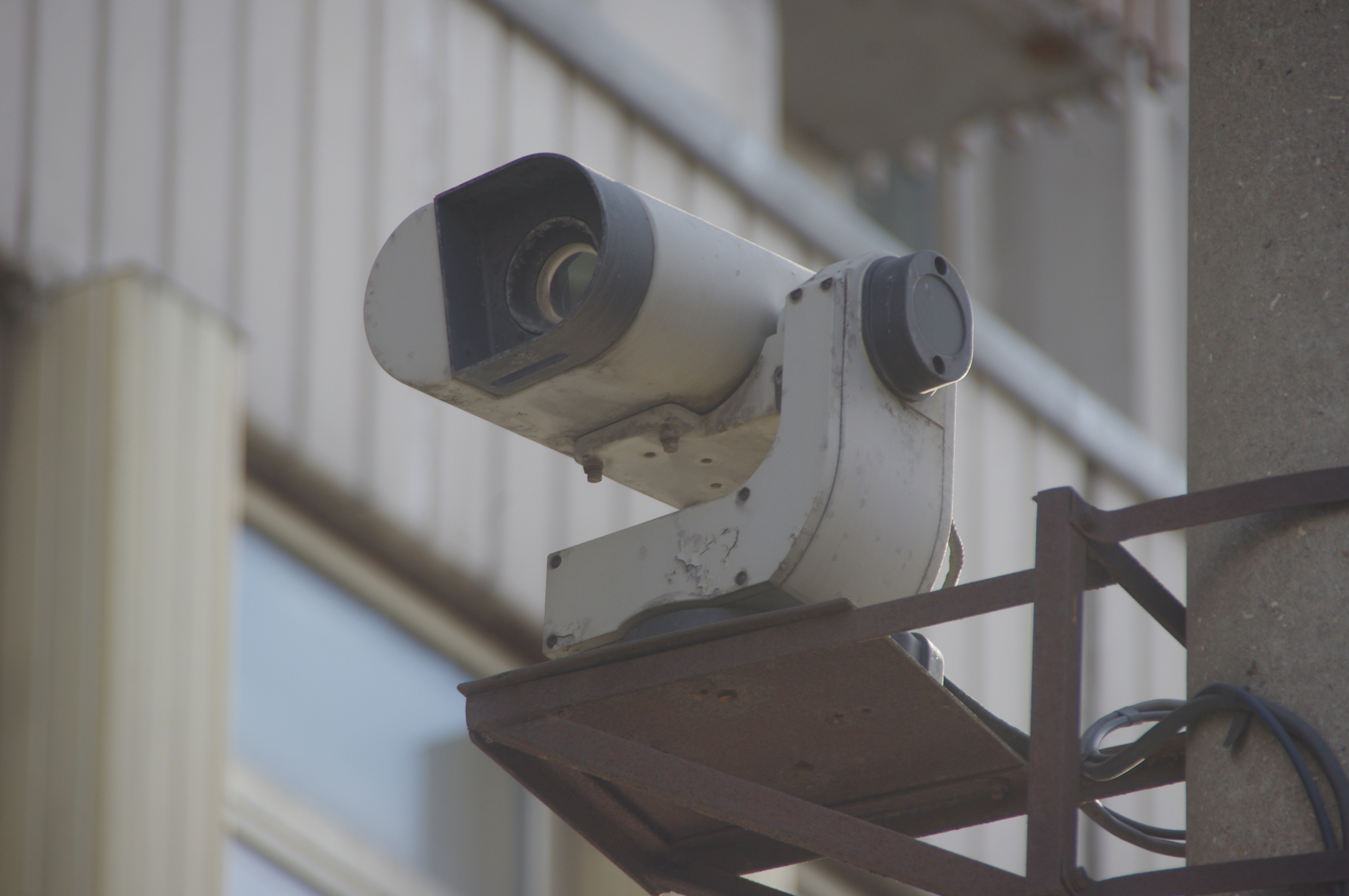
Soviet motorized CCTV camera

In 2017, in Russia, the Moscow network included 160,000 CCTV cameras and 95 percent of residential buildings; over 3,500 Russian cameras were connected to the General Centre for Data Storage and Processing. Video recordings are used to solve 70 percent of offenses and crimes. In 2024, there are over 1 million video surveillance cameras in Russia. About 230,000 are in use in Moscow alone. According to data from the Russian Minister for Digital Development, Maksut Shadayev, one in three of all CCTVs in Russia were connected to a facial recognition system. A leaked document revealed that the president of Russia, Vladimir Putin, called on the Russian security services to fund "a massive AI-based surveillance apparatus". The spending of over US$115 million was planned for the system in 2024–2026.

=== In Europe ===
==== In the United Kingdom ====
In the United Kingdom, the vast majority of CCTV cameras are operated not by government bodies, but by private individuals or companies, especially to monitor the interiors of shops and businesses. According to the Freedom of Information Act 2000 requests, the total number of local government-operated CCTV cameras was around 52,000 over the entirety of the UK.

An article published in CCTV Image magazine estimated the number of private and local government-operated cameras in the United Kingdom was 1.85 million in 2011. The estimate was based on extrapolating from a comprehensive survey of public and private cameras within the Cheshire Constabulary jurisdiction. This works out as an average of one camera for every 32 people in the UK, although the density of cameras varies greatly from place to place. The Cheshire report also claims that the average person on a typical day would be seen by 70 CCTV cameras.

The Cheshire figure is regarded as more dependable than a previous study by Michael McCahill and Clive Norris of UrbanEye published in 2002. Based on a small sample in Putney High Street, McCahill and Norris extrapolated the number of surveillance cameras in Greater London to be around 500,000 and the total number of cameras in the UK to be around 4.2 million. According to their estimate, the UK has one camera for every 14 people. Although it has been acknowledged for several years that the methodology behind this figure is flawed, it has been widely quoted. Furthermore, the figure of 500,000 for Greater London is often confused with the figure for the police and local government-operated cameras in the City of London, which was about 650 in 2011.

The CCTV User Group estimated that there were around 1.5 million private and local government CCTV cameras in city centres, stations, airports, and major retail areas in the UK. Research conducted by the Scottish Centre for Crime and Justice Research and based on a survey of all Scottish local authorities identified that there are over 2,200 public space CCTV cameras in Scotland. The UK has often been cited as a country that has one of the most CCTV cameras in Europe.

=== In Africa ===
In South Africa, due to the high crime rate, CCTV surveillance is widely prevalent. The first IP camera was released in 1996 by Axis Communications, but IP cameras did not arrive in South Africa until 2008. To regulate the number of suppliers in 2001, the Private Security Industry Regulation Act was passed requiring all security companies to be registered with the Private Security Industry Regulatory Authority (PSIRA). In Egypt, the capital city of Cairo has approximately 47,000 cameras, while the New Administrative Capital has more than 6,000 surveillance cameras in 2023. In South Sudan, the Ministry of Interior has reinstated the operation of CCTV surveillance cameras in Juba after the cameras have been inactive for over four years; South Sudan also launched a drone security system in 2024 in Juba.

== Privacy ==
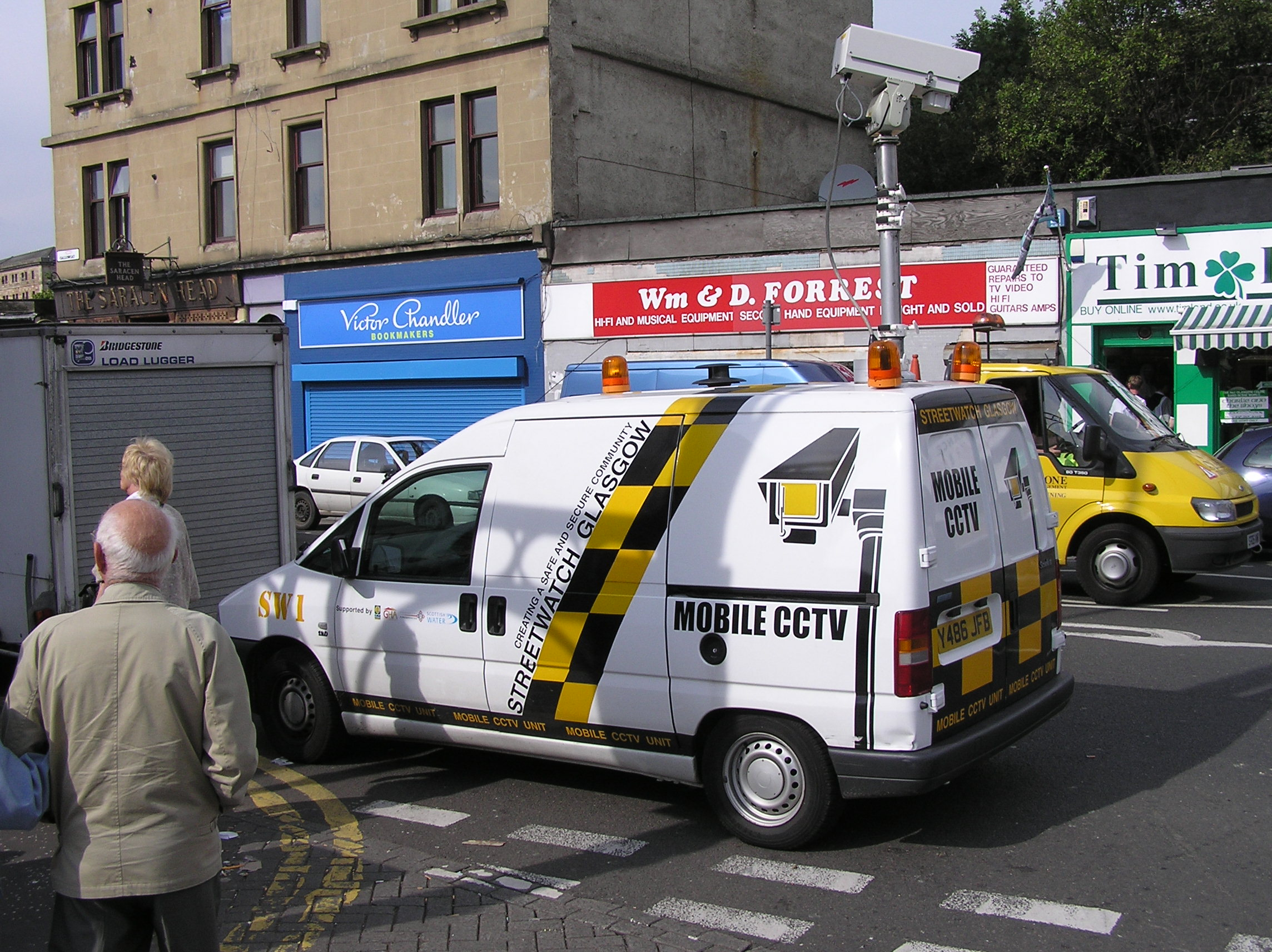
A mobile closed-circuit TV van monitoring a street market

Proponents of CCTV cameras argue that cameras are effective at deterring and solving crime, and that appropriate regulation and legal restrictions on surveillance of public spaces can provide sufficient protections so that an individual's right to privacy can reasonably be weighed against the benefits of surveillance. However, anti-surveillance activists have held that there is a right to privacy in public areas, that the development of CCTV in public areas, linked to databases of people's pictures and identity, presents a breach of civil liberties and the loss of anonymity in public places.

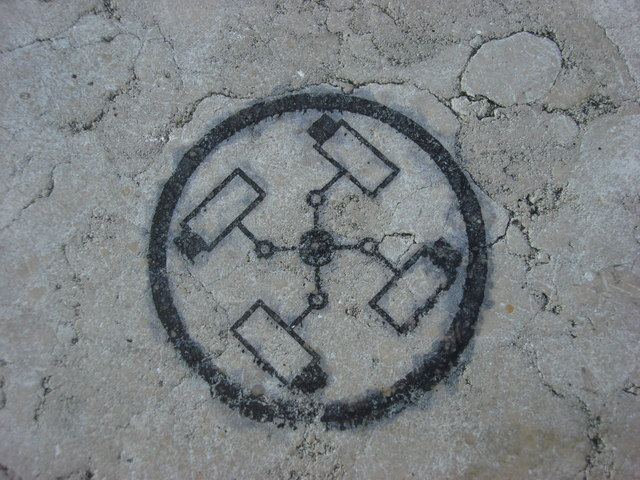
Anti-CCTV graffiti on the wall of the British Library

Furthermore, some scholars have argued that situations wherein a person's rights can be justifiably compromised are so rare as to not sufficiently warrant the frequent compromising of public privacy rights that occurs in regions with widespread CCTV surveillance. For example, in her book Setting the Watch: Privacy and the Ethics of CCTV Surveillance, Beatrice von Silva-Tarouca Larsen argues that CCTV surveillance is ethically permissible only in "certain restrictively defined situations", such as when a specific location has a "comprehensively documented and significant criminal threat".

=== Law by countries ===
==== United States ====
In the United States, the Constitution does not explicitly include the right to privacy although the Supreme Court has said several of the amendments to the Constitution implicitly grant this right. Access to video surveillance recordings may require a judge's writ, which is readily available. However, there is little legislation and regulation specific to video surveillance.

==== Canada ====
In Canada, the use of video surveillance has grown very rapidly. In Ontario, both the municipal and provincial versions of the Freedom of Information and Protection of Privacy Act outline guidelines that control how images and information can be gathered by this method and or released.

==== European Union ====
All countries in the European Union are signatories to the European Convention on Human Rights, which protects individual rights, including the right to privacy. The General Data Protection Regulation (GDPR) required that the footage should only be retained for as long as necessary for the purpose for which it was collected.

==== Sweden ====
In Sweden, the use of CCTV in public spaces is regulated both nationally and via GDPR. In an opinion poll commissioned by Lund University in August 2017, the general public of Sweden was asked to choose one measure that would ensure their need for privacy when subject to CCTV operation in public spaces: 43% favored regulation in the form of clear routines for managing, storing, and distributing image material generated from surveillance cameras, 39% favored regulation in the form of clear signage informing that camera surveillance in public spaces is present, 10% favored regulation in the form of having restrictive policies for issuing permits for surveillance cameras in public spaces, 6% were unsure, and 2% favored regulation in the form of having permits restricting the use of surveillance cameras during certain times.

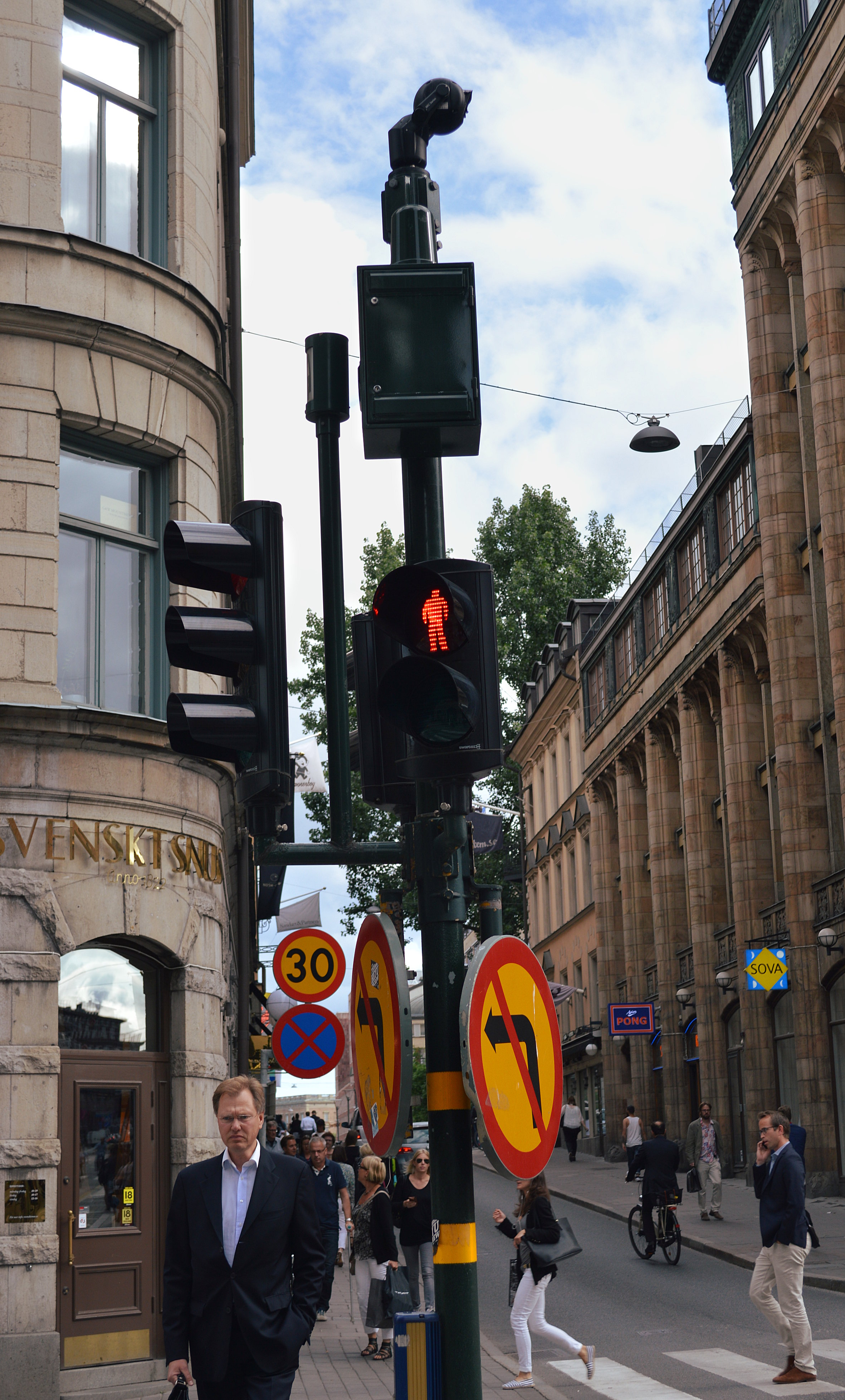
A surveillance camera aimed at a public street (Kungsgatan) in Stockholm, Sweden, mounted on top of the pole

In an updated opinion poll commissioned by Lund University in December 2019, the general public of Sweden was asked to share their attitudes toward the use of surveillance cameras (CCTV) in public spaces. A significant majority, 88%, expressed a positive view—45% were very positive and 43% quite positive—while only 11% held negative views, and 1% were unsure. Participants were also asked whether they believed surveillance cameras in various environments violated their personal privacy. A majority rejected that such surveillance violated their privacy at national border-crossings (82%), in city centers (77%), parks and green spaces (74%), large public events (80%), and healthcare units (68%). Somewhat less rejection was observed for surveillance in residential areas, where 67% rejected the notion that it violated their privacy. When asked about the perceived use of automatic facial recognition in surveillance cameras in Sweden, 9% believed it was used quite a lot, 55% believed it was not used much, 21% believed it was not used at all, and 15% were unsure. Regarding privacy risks, 55% of respondents believed the greatest risk came from commercial documentation of individuals (e.g., data collection tracking online consumer behavior), followed by 20% who pointed to other members of the public documenting them (e.g., photography or audio recording), and 11% who saw the greatest risk in public sector data collection (e.g., by law enforcement or healthcare providers). 15% were unsure. When asked to whom they would turn to report a privacy breach related to public camera surveillance, 35% said the Swedish National Police, 6% mentioned the Swedish Data Protection Authority, and 39% did not know where to turn.

==== United Kingdom ====
In the United Kingdom, the Data Protection Act 1998 imposes legal restrictions on the uses of CCTV recordings and mandates the registration of CCTV systems with the Data Protection Agency. In 2004, the successor to the Data Protection Agency, the Information Commissioner's Office, clarified that this required registration of all CCTV systems with the Commissioner and prompt deletion of archived recordings. However, subsequent case law (Durant v Financial Services Authority) limited the scope of the protection provided by this law, and not all CCTV systems are currently regulated.

A 2007 report by the UK Information Commissioner's Office highlighted the need for the public to be made more aware of the growing use of surveillance and the potential impact on civil liberties. In the same year, a campaign group claimed that the majority of CCTV cameras in the UK are operated illegally or are in breach of privacy guidelines. In response, the Information Commissioner's Office rebutted the claim and added that any reported abuses of the Data Protection Act are swiftly investigated. Even if there are some concerns arising from the use of CCTV such as involving privacy, more commercial establishments are still installing CCTV systems in the UK. In 2012, the UK government enacted the Protection of Freedoms Act which includes several provisions related to controlling the storage and use of information about individuals. Under this Act, the Home Office published a code of practice in 2013 for the use of surveillance cameras by government and local authorities. The code wrote that "surveillance by consent should be regarded as analogous to policing by consent."

==== Philippines ====
In the Philippines, the main laws governing CCTV usage are Data Privacy Act of 2012 and the Cybercrime Prevention Act of 2012. The Data Privacy Act of 2012 (Republic Act No. 10173) is the primary law that governs data privacy in the Philippines. The Act mandates that the privacy of individuals must be respected and protected. The law applies to CCTV cameras as they collect and process personal data. The Cybercrime Prevention Act of 2012 (Republic Act No. 10175) includes provisions that apply to CCTV usage. Under the Act, the unauthorized access to, interception of, or interference with data is a criminal offense. This means that unauthorized access to CCTV footage could potentially be considered a cybercrime.

== Technological developments ==
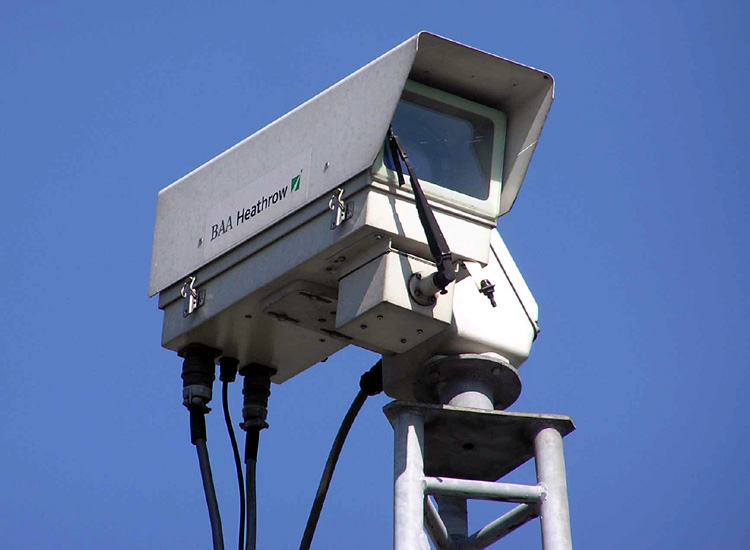
Surveillance camera at London Heathrow Airport with a wiper for clear images during rain

=== Computer-controlled identification ===
Computer-controlled cameras can identify, track, and categorize objects in their field of view. Video content analysis, also referred to as video analytics, is the capability of automatically analyzing video to detect and determine temporal events not based on a single image but rather on object classification. Advanced VCA applications can measure object speed. Some video analytics applications can be used to apply rules to designated areas. These rules can relate to access control. For example, they can describe which objects can enter into a specific area. There are different approaches to implementing VCA technology. Data may be processed on the camera itself (edge processing) or by a centralized server. Artificial intelligence-powered CCTV cameras have also been further tested to detect congestion, be used as a facial recognition system, and predict signs of criminal activities.

=== Compression ===
There is a cost in the retention of the images produced by CCTV systems. The amount and quality of data stored on storage media is subject to compression ratios, images stored per second, and image size, and is affected by the retention period of the videos or images. DVRs store images in a variety of proprietary file formats. CCTV security cameras can either store the images on a local hard disk drive, an SD card, or in the cloud. Recordings may be retained for a preset amount of time and then automatically archived, overwritten, or deleted, the period being determined by the organisation that generated them.

=== IP cameras ===
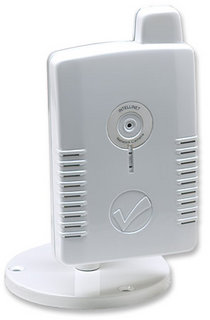
A wireless IP camera

A growing branch in CCTV is Internet Protocol cameras (IP cameras). It is estimated that 2014 was the first year that IP cameras outsold analog cameras. IP cameras use the Internet Protocol (IP) used by most local area networks (LANs) to transmit video across data networks in digital form. IP can optionally be transmitted across the public internet, allowing users to view their cameras remotely on a computer or phone via an internet connection. IP cameras are considered part of the Internet of things (IoT) and have many of the same benefits and security risks as other IP-enabled devices. Smart doorbells are one example of a type of CCTV that uses IP to allow it to send alerts.

The main types of IP cameras include fixed cameras, pan–tilt–zoom (PTZ) cameras, and multi-sensor cameras. Fixed cameras' resolution typically does not exceed 20 megapixels. The main feature of a PTZ is its remote directional and optical zoom capability. With multi-sensor cameras, wider areas can be monitored. Industrial video surveillance systems use network video recorders to support IP cameras. These devices are responsible for the recording, storage, video stream processing, and alarm management. Since 2008, IP video surveillance manufacturers can use a standardized network interface (ONVIF) to support compatibility between systems. For professional or public infrastructure security applications, IP video is restricted to within a private network or VPN.

=== Networking CCTV cameras ===
The city of Chicago operates a networked video surveillance system which combines CCTV video feeds of government agencies with those of the private sector, installed in city buses, businesses, public schools, subway stations, housing projects, etc. Even homeowners are able to contribute footage. It is estimated to incorporate the video feeds of a total of 15,000 cameras. The system is used by Chicago's Office of Emergency Management in case of an emergency call: it detects the caller's location and instantly displays the real-time video feed of the nearest security camera to the operator, not requiring any user intervention. While the system is far too vast to allow complete real-time monitoring, it stores the video data for use as evidence in criminal cases.

=== Wireless security cameras ===
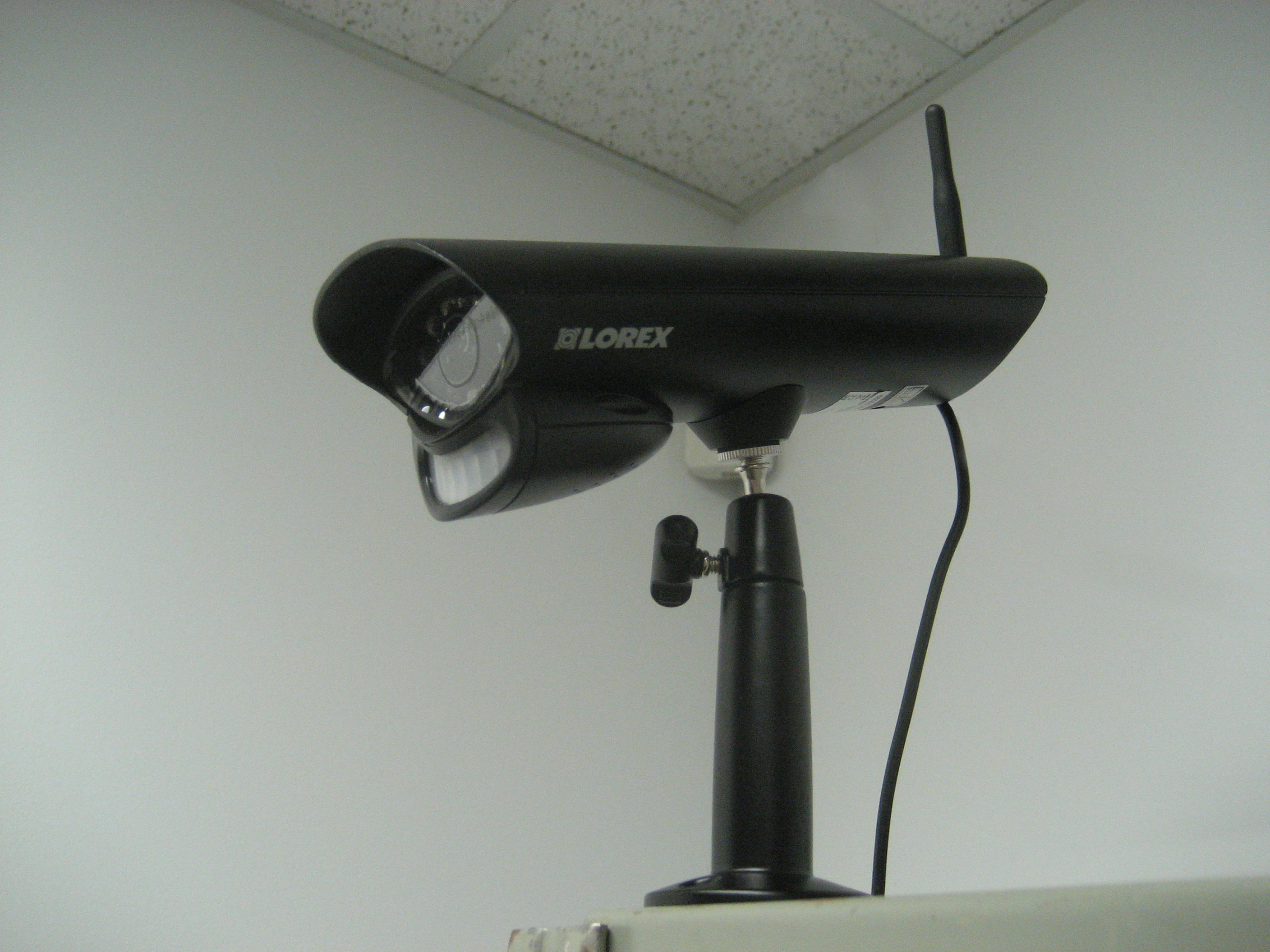
Wireless security camera

Many consumers are turning to wireless security cameras for home surveillance. Wireless cameras do not require a video cable for video/audio transmission, simply a cable for power. Wireless cameras are also easy and inexpensive to install. Previous generations of wireless security cameras relied on analogue technology; modern wireless cameras use digital technology with usually more secure and interference-free signals. Wireless mesh networks have been used for connection with the other radios in the same group. There are also cameras using solar power. Wireless IP cameras can become a client on the WLAN, and they can be configured with encryption and authentication protocols with a connection to an access point.

=== Talking CCTV ===
In Wiltshire, United Kingdom, in 2003, a pilot scheme for what is now known as "Talking CCTV" was put into action, allowing operators of CCTV cameras to communicate through the camera via a speaker when it is needed. In 2005, Ray Mallon, the mayor and former senior police officer of Middlesbrough, implemented "Talking CCTV" in his area. Other towns have had such cameras installed. In 2007, several of the devices were installed in Bridlington town centre, East Riding of Yorkshire.

== Countermeasures ==
In December 2016, a form of anti-CCTV and facial recognition sunglasses called "reflectacles" were invented by a craftsman based in Chicago named Scott Urban. They reflect infrared and, optionally, visible light which makes the user's face a white blur to cameras. The project passed its funding goal of $28,000, and "reflectacles" became commercially available in June 2017.

== See also ==
- Artificial intelligence for video surveillance
- Bugging
- "CATV" as cable television—not to be confused with CCTV
- Closed-circuit television camera
- Day and night camera
- Effio, uncompressed analog streaming video format
- Eye in the sky (camera)
- Fake security camera
- INDECT
- IP camera
- Security operations center
- Security smoke
- Smart camera
- Sousveillance (inverse surveillance)
- Surveillance
- The Convention on Modern Liberty
- TV Network Protocol
- Under vehicle inspection
- Video content analysis
- Digital evidence
- Videotelephony
- Washington County Closed-Circuit Educational Television Project
- Surveillance drone
