= Effio =

Analog video format

Sony EFFIO HD CCTV Video Format is an uncompressed analog streaming video format used in for closed-circuit television especially used for crime prevention and video surveillance and monitoring. As of August 2012, little is known about the inner workings of the format. It does seem to be a version of the broadcast uncompressed streaming SDI, similar to HDCCTV, HDMI, and DVI. Effio chips can be assembled in a variety of CCTV Cameras and are common in usage by many manufacturers of CCTV Cameras.
