= Nordic Journal of Criminology =

- Discipline: Criminology
- Language: English
- Edited by: Sébastien Tutenges

Publication details
- History: 1965–present
- Publisher: Taylor and Francis
- Frequency: Biannually

Standard abbreviations
- ISO 4: Nord. J. Criminol.

Indexing
- ISSN: 1404-3858 (print); 1651-2340 (web)
- OCLC no.: 45255275

Links
- Journal homepage

The Nordic Journal of Criminology (abbreviated NJC) is a peer-reviewed academic journal covering the field of criminology. It is published biannually by Taylor and Francis on behalf of the Scandinavian Research Council for Criminology, together with the Danish, Finnish and Norwegian Crime Prevention Councils, the Finnish National Research Institute of Legal Policy, and the Department of Criminology and Sociology of Law at Oslo University. The journal focuses on the Scandinavian or Nordic tradition of criminology research. The editor-in-chief is Sébastien Tutenges (Lund University) and co-editor is Susanne Boethius (Lund University).

The journal was established in 1965 as an annual publication under the title Scandinavian Studies in Criminology by the "quasi-official" Scandinavian Research Council for Criminology. In 2000 it merged with the journal Studies on Crime & Crime Prevention, established in 1992, and was named the Journal of Scandinavian Studies in Criminology and Crime Prevention until 2018 when it received its current name. Before it was acquired by Taylor and Francis it was published by Universitetsforlaget.

The journal is abstracted and indexed in Scopus, PsycINFO, EBSCO Legal Source, Criminal Justice Abstracts, and Academic Search.
