= INDECT =

Research project in the area of intelligent security systems

- Intelligent information system supporting observation, searching and detection for security of citizens in urban environment
- Keywords: security, computer data processing, metadata, digital watermarking, artificial intelligence, signal processing
- Project type: Collaborative Project
- Funding agency: European Union
- Reference: FP7-2007-SEC-218086
- Objective: SEC-2007-1.2-01 Intelligent urban environment observation system
- Project coordinator: AGH – University of Science and Technology (Poland)
- Participants: Gdansk University of Technology (Poland); InnoTec DATA GmbH & Co. (Germany); IP Grenoble (Ensimag) (France); General Headquarters of Police (Poland); Products and Systems of Information Technology (Germany); Police Service of Northern Ireland (United Kingdom); Poznan University of Technology (Poland); Universidad Carlos III de Madrid (Spain); Technical University of Sofia (Bulgaria); University of Wuppertal (Germany); University of York (United Kingdom); Technical University of Ostrava (Czech Republic); Technical University of Kosice (Slovak Republic); X-Art Pro Division G.m.b.H. (Austria); Fachhochschule Technikum Wien (Austria)
- Budget: Total: 14,828,107.00 Euro; Funding: 10,906,984.00 Euro
- Duration: 2009-01-01 – 2014-06-30
- Website: www.indect-project.eu

INDECT is a research project in the area of intelligent security systems performed by several European universities since 2009 and funded by the European Union. The purpose of the project is to involve European scientists and researchers in the development of solutions to and tools for automatic threat detection through e.g. processing of CCTV camera data streams, standardization of video sequence quality for user applications, threat detection in computer networks as well as data and privacy protection.

The area of research, applied methods, and techniques are described in the public deliverables which are available to the public on the project's website. Practically, all information related to the research is public. Only documents that comprise information related to financial data or information that could negatively influence the competitiveness and law enforcement capabilities of parties involved in the project are not published. This follows regulations and practices applied in EU research projects.

== Application and target users ==
The main end-user of INDECT solutions are police forces and security services.

The principle of operation of the project is detecting threats and identifying sources of threats, without monitoring and searching for particular citizens or groups of citizens. Then, the system operator (i.e. police officer) decides whether an intervention of services responsible for public security are required or not. Further investigation eventually leading to persons related to threats is performed, preserving the presumption of innocence, based on existing procedures already used by police services and prosecutors. As it can be found in the project deliverables, INDECT does not involve storage of personal data (such as names, addresses, identity document numbers, etc.).

A similar, behavior-based surveillance program was SAMURAI (Suspicious and Abnormal behavior Monitoring Using a netwoRk of cAmeras & sensors for sItuation awareness enhancement).

== Expected results ==
The main expected results of the INDECT project are:

- Trial of intelligent analysis of video and audio data for threat detection in urban environments
- Creation of tools and technology for privacy and data protection during storage and transmission of information using quantum cryptography and new methods of digital watermarking
- Performing computer-aided detection of threats and targeted crimes in Internet resources with privacy-protecting solutions
- Construction of a search engine for rapid semantic search based on watermarking of content related to child pornography and human organ trafficking
- Implementation of a distributed computer system that is capable of effective intelligent processing

== Controversy ==
Some media and other sources accuse INDECT of privacy abuse, collecting personal data, and keeping information from the public. Consequently, these issues have been commented and discussed by some Members of the European Parliament.

As seen in the project's documentation, INDECT does not involve mobile phone tracking or call interception.

The rumors about testing INDECT during 2012 UEFA European Football Championship also turned out to be false.

The mid-term review of the Seventh Framework Programme to the European Parliament strongly urges the European Commission to immediately make all documents available and to define a clear and strict mandate for the research goal, the application, and the end users of INDECT, and stresses a thorough investigation of the possible impact on fundamental rights. Nevertheless, according to Mr. Paweł Kowal, MEP, the project had the ethical review on 15 March 2011 in Brussels with the participation of ethics experts from Austria, France, Netherlands, Germany and Great Britain.

== See also ==
- Facial recognition system
- Mass surveillance (European Union)
- Behavioral Recognition Systems, Inc.
- Video content analysis
- Artificial intelligence for video surveillance
