= General Personal Data Protection Law =

Brazilian regulation on the processing of personal data

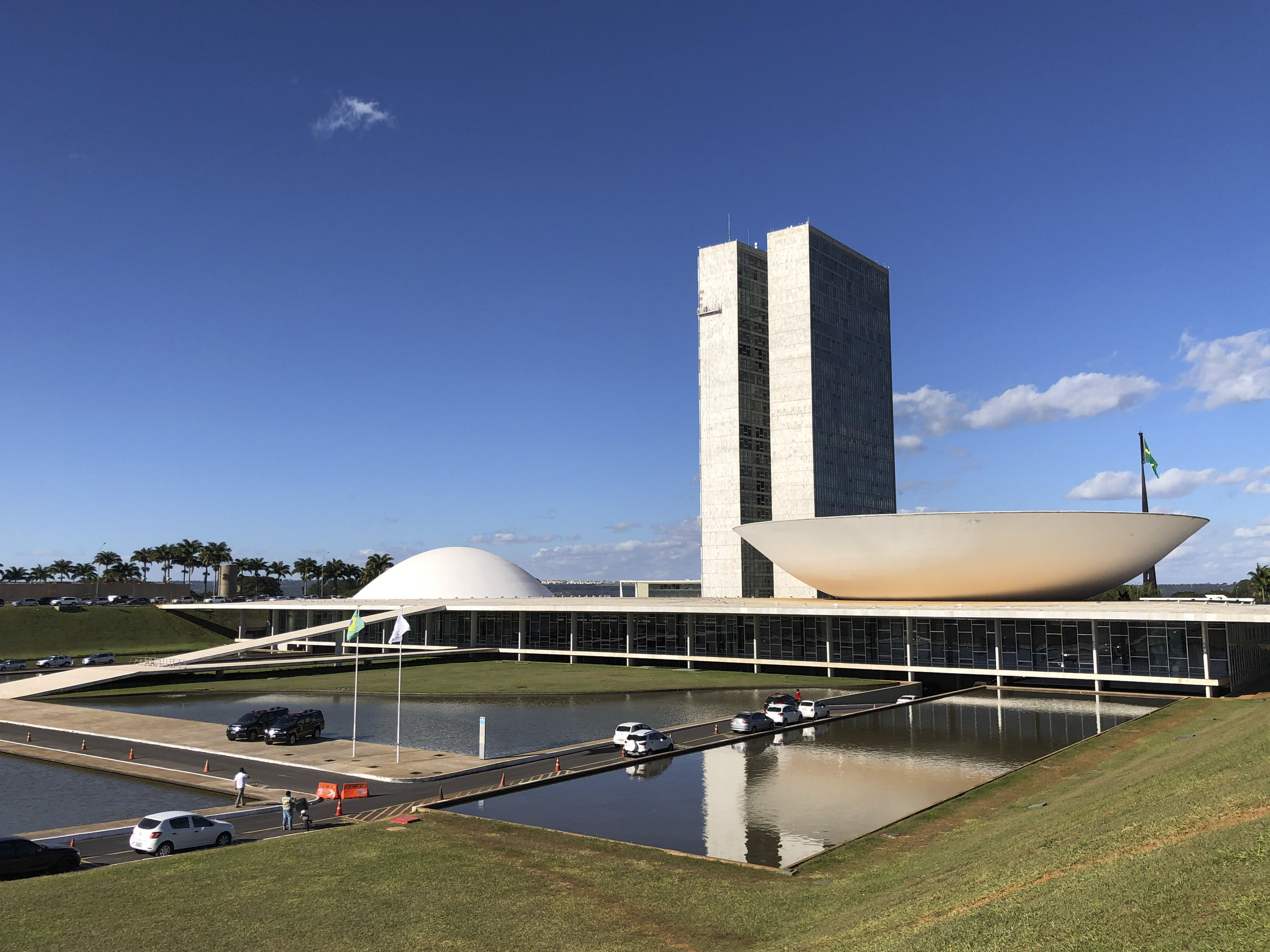

National Congress of Brazil
- Long title: Portuguese: Dispõe sobre a proteção de dados pessoais e altera a Lei nº 12.965, de 23 de abril de 2014 (Marco Civil da Internet) Diposes about personal data protection and makes changes to Law 12965 of April 23, 2014
- Citation: Law No. 13.709 August 14, 2018
- Territorial extent: Worldwide
- Passed by: Chamber of Deputies
- Passed: May 29, 2018
- Passed by: Federal Senate
- Passed: July 10, 2018
- Signed by: Michel Temer, President of Brazil
- Signed: August 14, 2018
- Commenced: August 16, 2020
- Administered by: Data Protection National Authority

Legislative history

First chamber: Chamber of Deputies
- Bill title: Law Project no. 4060/2012
- Introduced by: Dep. Milton Monti (PL-SP)
- Introduced: June 13, 2012
- First reading: June 28, 2012
- Second reading: May 29, 2018
- Third reading: May 29, 2018

Second chamber: Federal Senate
- Bill title: Chamber Law Project no. 53/2018
- Received from the Chamber of Deputies: June 1, 2018
- First reading: June 1, 2018
- Second reading: July 10, 2018
- Status: In force

The General Personal Data Protection Law (Portuguese: Lei Geral de Proteção de Dados Pessoais, or LGPD; Lei 13709/2018), is a statutory law on data protection and privacy in the Federative Republic of Brazil. The law's primary aim is to unify 40 different Brazilian laws that regulate the processing of personal data. The LGPD contains provisions and requirements related to the processing of personal data of individuals, where the data is of individuals located in Brazil, where the data is collected or processed in Brazil, or where the data is used to offer goods or services to individuals in Brazil.

The LGPD became law on September 18, 2020, but its enforceability was backdated August 16, 2020. Sanctions under the regulation will only be applied from August 1, 2021.

The national data protection authority responsible for enforcement of the LGPD is the Autoridade Nacional de Proteção de Dados, or ANPD.

== Contents ==
The LGPD contains sixty-five articles and defines new legal concepts in Brazilian law, such as personal data and sensitive personal data. The law sets out the rights of the subjects of personal data, and under what conditions that data can be collected, processed, stored, and shared. It also specifies the obligations of the entity processing that data, and the exceptions to the law.

In Article 18, the LGPD allows the data subject right to do the following:

1. To confirm that their personal data is being processed.
2. To access their personal data.
3. To correct incomplete, incorrect or out-of-date personal data.
4. To anonymise, block, or delete any unnecessary, excessive, or non-compliant personal data.
5. To request that a data controller moves their personal data to another service or product provider.
6. To delete their personal data.
7. To be given information about how their personal data has been shared.
8. To be given information about their rights to not give consent to process their personal data.
9. To withdraw consent to process their personal data.

Article 7 describes the conditions under which personal data may be processed:

1. With the data subject's consent.
2. To comply with the data controller's legal or regulatory responsibilities.
3. For public administration and carrying out public policies set out in law, regulation, or in contracts.
4. For research studies (anonymised where possible).
5. To carry out a contract.
6. To exercise Brazilian law.
7. To protect life or personal safety.
8. By healthcare or sanitation professionals, to safeguard a person's health.
9. For the legitimate interest of the data controller or a third party, unless that would infringe upon the data subject's statutory rights.
10. To protect credit ratings.

== Enforcement ==
Article 48 of the LGPD states that the data controller must inform the national data protection authority and the data subject, if a security incident occurs that may result in relevant damage or risk, in a reasonable time period (as defined by ANPD).

Article 52 states that the maximum fine for breaching LGPD is two percent of a private company's revenue in Brazil, up to a maximum of 50 million reais.

== Comparison with GDPR ==
The process of combining separate data protection laws in to one was inspired by the EU's General Data Protection Regulation, which was adopted on April 14, 2016. The LGPD and the GDPR have similar definitions of personal data and essentially the same data subject rights. The regulations differ on the legal basis for processing data, where the LGPD additionally includes carrying out research studies and protecting credit ratings. Additionally, the LGPD does not specify a time period in which data breaches must be reported and the penalties for breaching the LGPD are lower than that for GDPR.

== Timeline ==
In 2015, the Brazilian Government issued the Preliminary Draft Bill for the Protection of Personal Data and submitted it to public consultation, before being sent to Congress for discussion and vote.

On August 14, 2018, the Brazilian National Congress first passed the General Personal Data Protection Law.

On December 28, 2018 Michel Temer issued provisional measure 869 that amended the LGPD to include the creation of a national data protection authority responsible for enforcement of the law called Autoridade Nacional de Proteção de Dados (ANPD).

On April 29, 2020, President Jair Bolsonaro issued Provisional Measure 959 that postponed the effective date of the LGPD to May 3, 2021. On August 26, 2020, The Chamber of Deputies, Brazil's lower house, amended the measure to make the LGPD take effect on December 31, 2020. The Federal Senate, Brazil's upper house then decided that any postponement was void because the effective date had already been decided by congress. The LGPD passed in the Senate on September 16, 2020, and was sent to Jair Bolsonaro to sign into law on September 17, 2020. The LGPD became law on September 18, 2020, and its enforceability was backdated August 16, 2020. Sanctions under the regulation were to only be applied from August 2021.

== See also ==
- Habeas data, a constitutional remedy in the Brazilian constitution
