= Day and night camera =

Type of security camera

A day and night camera is a security camera that can see the picture during the day hours, when there is enough sunlight, and during the night in total darkness or minimum illumination. A day and night camera has special lenses that allow infrared emission produced by infrared LEDs and reflected from objects to go through and reach a CCD or CMOS chip inside the camera. As a result, the end user can see picture in total darkness at the distance of infrared emission produced by LEDs. A day and night camera can have infrared LEDs mounted on its housing or can accept the emission, produced by an infrared turret. Day and night cameras often have modifications in their digital signal processor (DSP) that compensates for the difference in illumination between day and night modes. HDR technology may also be used in more expensive models to compensate for the difference in illumination between shaded and lighted areas of surveillance.

== See also ==
- Camera lens
