= TF algorithm =

TF algorithm may refer to:

- Teknomo–Fernandez algorithm, an algorithm for generating the background image of a given video sequence
- TensorFlow, an open-source software library for machine learning
