= Vibe =

Vibe, alternatively vibes, is short for vibration.

Vibe may also refer to:

== People ==
- DJ Vibe (born 1968), Portuguese DJ
- Lasse Vibe (born 1987), Danish footballer

== Media ==
- Vibe (magazine), a magazine about music artists, actors and other entertainers
- Vibe (character), a comic book character in the DC Comics universe

== Music ==
- Vibe (Bangladeshi band), Bangladeshi heavy metal band
- Vibe (South Korean band), an R&B group
- Naver Vibe, a South Korean music streaming service

=== Albums ===
- Vibe (album), a 1997 album by Caught in the Act
- The Vibe (Lexington Bridge album), 2007
- The Vibe (Roy Hargrove album), 1992
- Vibe, a 2016 album by Fler
- Vibe, a 2021 album by Franglish

=== Songs ===
- "Vibe" (Taeyang song), 2023
- "Vibe" (Tove Styrke song), 2018
- "Vibe" (Zhané song), 1994
- "Vibe", by Editors from EBM, 2022
- "Vibe", by JoJo from Mad Love, 2016
- "Vibe", by the Rasmus from Hell of a Tester, 1998
- "Vibe (If I Back It Up)", by Cookiee Kawaii, 2019
- "The Vibe", by EXID from We, 2019

== Television ==
- Vibe (talk show), a 1997 American late night talk show
- Vibe (TV channel), a New Zealand television channel on SKY Network Television

== Radio ==
- VIBE FM (Romania), a radio station in Romania
- KCHZ (95-7 The Vibe), a radio station in Ottawa, Kansas
- The Vibe 98.8, a fictional radio station from Grand Theft Auto IV
- CIBK-FM, a radio station in Calgary (2002-2010), now "98.5 Virgin Radio"
- ZFKV-FM, a radio station in the Cayman Islands (2001-2018), now Island FM
- Kiss (UK radio station) (Vibe 101), a radio station in the United Kingdom, now known as Kiss
- Kiss 105-108 (Vibe FM 105-108)), a defunct radio station in East of England
- CHRY-FM (VIBE 105.5), a radio station in Toronto, Ontario

== Software ==
- ViBe, a software method for background extraction in moving images
- Vibe coding, a programming paradigm based on AI assistance
- Vibe or Mistral Vibe, a generative AI chatbot of the French company Mistral AI
- Novell Vibe, a web based document management and collaboration system

== Other ==
- Atlanta Vibe, American professional volleyball team
- Ozone Vibe, a French paraglider design
- Pontiac Vibe, a compact automobile sold by General Motors from 2002 to 2010
- ViBE, a brand name for a Philips GoGear portable media player

== See also ==
- Vibes (disambiguation)
