= Moving object detection =

Technique used in videos to detect moment

Moving object detection is a technique used in computer vision and image processing. Multiple consecutive frames from a video are compared by various methods to determine if any moving object is detected.

Moving objects detection has been used for wide range of applications like video surveillance, activity recognition, road condition monitoring, airport safety, monitoring of protection along marine border, etc.

== Definition ==
Moving object detection is to recognize the physical movement of an object in a given place or region. By acting segmentation among moving objects and stationary area or region, the moving objects' motion can be tracked and thus analyzed later. To achieve this, consider a video is a structure built upon single frames, moving object detection is to find the foreground moving target(s), either in each video frame or only when the moving target shows the first appearance in the video.

== Traditional methods ==
Among all the traditional moving object detection methods, we could categorize them into four major approaches: Background subtraction, Frame differencing, Temporal Differencing, and Optical Flow.

=== Frame differencing ===
Instead of using traditional approach, to use image subtraction operator by subtracting second and images afterwards, the frame differencing method makes comparisons between two successive frames to detect moving targets.

=== Temporal differencing ===
The temporal differencing method identifies the moving object by applying pixel-wise difference method with two or three consecutive frames.

== See also ==
- Object detection
- Motion estimation
- Video tracking
