= Vibes =

Vibes may refer to:

- The energy given off by a person, or the atmosphere of a place or event
- The vibraphone, a percussive musical instrument
- Vibes (company) a mobile marketing company

== Media ==
- Vibes (film), a 1988 comedy
- Vibes (video game), a 2010 video game by Laughing Jackal

== Music ==
- Vibes (soundtrack), a 1988 soundtrack album from the film
- Vibes (Heavy D album), a 2008 album by Heavy D
- Vibes (Theophilus London album), a 2014 album by Theophilus London
- "Vibes" (song), a song by Six60 from Six60 EP
- "Vibes", a song by Tove Lo from Lady Wood
- Vibes, a 2017 EP by Moka Only and Reckognize Real

== See also ==
- Vybz Kartel (born 1976), Jamaican dancehall artist and lyricist
- Vybz 100.1 FM, a Guyanese radio station
- Vibe (disambiguation)
- Vibez (disambiguation)
- Gathering of the Vibes, a festival that celebrates the Grateful Dead
