= RCNN =

RCNN may refer to:

- Region Based Convolutional Neural Networks, a family of machine learning models for computer vision and specifically object detection.
- RCNN, the ICAO code for Tainan Airport
