= Sonair (technology firm) =

Norwegian technology company

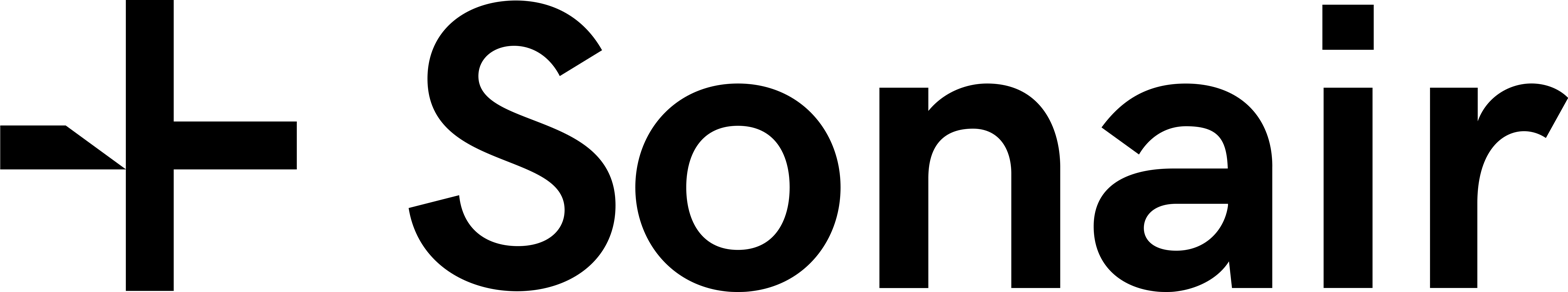
- Industry: Robotics
- Founded: 2022
- Headquarters: Oslo, Norway
- Key people: Knut Sandven (CEO), Dag Wang (CTO), Shermine Gotfredsen (CCO), Tor Odland (CMO)
- Website: https://www.sonair.com/

Sonair is a Norwegian technology company, founded in Oslo in 2022, that develops ultrasonic sensing technology used in robotics and automated applications.

The founding team drew on research from SINTEF, one of Europe's largest independent research organizations, to develop novel approaches for real-time 3D sensing. According to the company, its primary goal is to enhance the reliability and accuracy of automated platforms in environments where conventional optical sensors—such as cameras and LIDAR—can be limited by dust, darkness, or reflective surfaces. Since its inception, Sonair has concentrated on adapting ultrasonic technology from industrial and underwater applications to above-ground robotics.

== Technology ==
Sonair's flagship technology is called ADAR (Acoustic Detection and Ranging), which uses ultrasound in air to construct a 3D view of the surroundings. This "dolphin-inspired" approach involves emitting ultrasonic pulses and measuring the returning echoes to generate a spatial map, enabling precise distance measurements and object detection in real time.

== Funding ==
Since its establishment, Sonair has raised nearly $13 million from investors including Scale Capital, RunwayFBU, Investinor, ProVenture, SINTEF Venture, and others. These investments have supported the company’s product development, commercialization efforts, international expansion plans, and collaborations with robotics manufacturers.

== Recognition and Awards ==
In 2024, Sonair received a Best of Sensors Award from Fierce Electronics for its ADAR sensor and its potential to address sensing challenges in complex environments such as manufacturing floors, construction sites, and outdoor delivery robots.

In 2025, Sonair was awarded the Teknologiprisen by the Danish Industrial Robot Association (DIRA). The jury stated: “Sonair has achieved what many have worked toward for years — breaking the boundaries of physics and moving 3D ultrasound scanning from water into air. This represents a significant breakthrough in giving robots ‘vision’ in all directions — in a compact, energy-efficient, and cost-effective solution.”
