= Motion tracking =

Motion tracking may refer to:

- Motion capture, the process of recording the movement of objects or people
- Match moving, a cinematic technique that allows the insertion of computer graphics into live-action footage with correct position, scale, orientation, and motion relative to the objects in the shot
- Video tracking, the process of locating a moving object over time using a camera
- Positional tracking, technology for tracking motion and position of virtual reality and augmented reality devices.
