= Vibez =

Vibez may refer to:

- "Vibez" (DaBaby song), 2020 song by DaBaby
- "Vibez" (Zayn song), 2021 song by Zayn

== See also ==
- Vibes (disambiguation)
