= Vibes (company) =

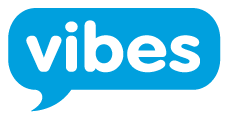
- Type: Private
- Industry: Mobile marketing
- Founded: 1998
- Headquarters: Chicago, Illinois, United States
- Key people: Jack Philbin (Co-Founder & CEO); Alex Campbell (Co-Founder & CIO); Brian Garofola (CTO); Charley Cassell (CFO)
- Products: Mobile wallet marketing/advertisingText messaging Push notificationsMobile web
- Website: www.vibes.com

Vibes operates as a privately owned enterprise specializing in mobile marketing, encompassing text message marketing (SMS and MMS), mobile wallet marketing, push notifications, and mobile web experiences. The company is headquartered in Chicago, Illinois.

== Technology ==
In 2013, Vibes initiated the deployment of Wallet Manager, a platform enabling enterprises to develop and oversee mobile wallet campaigns utilizing Apple's Passbook and Google Wallet. The company was introduced at the 2013 Google I/O developer conference as an early integration partner for the Google Wallet Objects API.

In 2014, the company introduced Vibes Connect, broadening access to Tier 1 mobile messaging aggregation services to a wider audience.

In February 2015, Vibes unveiled WalletAds, a product facilitating advertisers' integration with Apple's Passbook and Google Wallet. This functionality empowers consumers to save branded coupons and offers to their Passbook and Google Wallet apps directly from a mobile banner ad.

== History ==
Vibes was established in 1998 by Jack Philbin and Alex Campbell. Initially, the company operated as a free pager service sustained by advertisements. As mobile phones gained prominence in the early 2000s, Vibes transitioned its focus to serving as a marketing platform, facilitating instantaneous interaction between customers and advertisers. AT&T became the first carrier to enter into an agreement with Vibes in 2001.

In 2002, the company successfully executed 100 Text-2-Screen events, marking the inception of this type of campaign within the United States, across multiple professional sporting venues.

In 2008, the company secured a $15 million Series A funding round, with Fidelity Ventures serving as the lead investor.

In 2010, the company achieved the milestone of sending its 1 billionth text message.

In March 2015, Vibes and Adobe revealed a collaborative partnership aimed at integrating mobile wallet technology into the Adobe Marketing Cloud. This integration facilitates digital marketers utilizing the Adobe Marketing Cloud to incorporate mobile wallet offerings seamlessly with Passbook and Google Wallet, alongside SMS and Push messaging, into their marketing campaigns.

In June 2016, Syniverse, a company headquartered in Tampa, Florida, specializing in mobile technology for telecommunications firms and other enterprises, made a $45 million investment in Vibes, thereby acquiring a minority stake in the company. Later, in December 2016, Vibes acquired Red Fish Media, based in Miami. Red Fish Media specializes in mobile marketing, with products tailored to the healthcare industry.
