= Video tracking =

Locating a moving object by analyzing frames of a video

Video tracking is the process of locating a moving object (or multiple objects) over time using a camera. It has a variety of uses, some of which are: human-computer interaction, security and surveillance, video communication and compression, augmented reality, traffic control, medical imaging and video editing. Video tracking can be a time-consuming process due to the amount of data that is contained in video. Adding further to the complexity is the possible need to use object recognition techniques for tracking, a challenging problem in its own right.

== Objective ==
An example of visual servoing for the robot hand to catch a ball by object tracking with visual feedback that is processed by a high-speed image processing system.

The objective of video tracking is to associate target objects in consecutive video frames. The association can be especially difficult when the objects are moving fast relative to the frame rate. Another situation that increases the complexity of the problem is when the tracked object changes orientation over time. For these situations video tracking systems usually employ a motion model which describes how the image of the target might change for different possible motions of the object.

Examples of simple motion models are:

- When tracking planar objects, the motion model is a 2D transformation (affine transformation or homography) of an image of the object (e.g. the initial frame).
- When the target is a rigid 3D object, the motion model defines its aspect depending on its 3D position and orientation.
- For video compression, key frames are divided into macroblocks. The motion model is a disruption of a key frame, where each macroblock is translated by a motion vector given by the motion parameters.
- The image of deformable objects can be covered with a mesh, the motion of the object is defined by the position of the nodes of the mesh.

== Algorithms ==
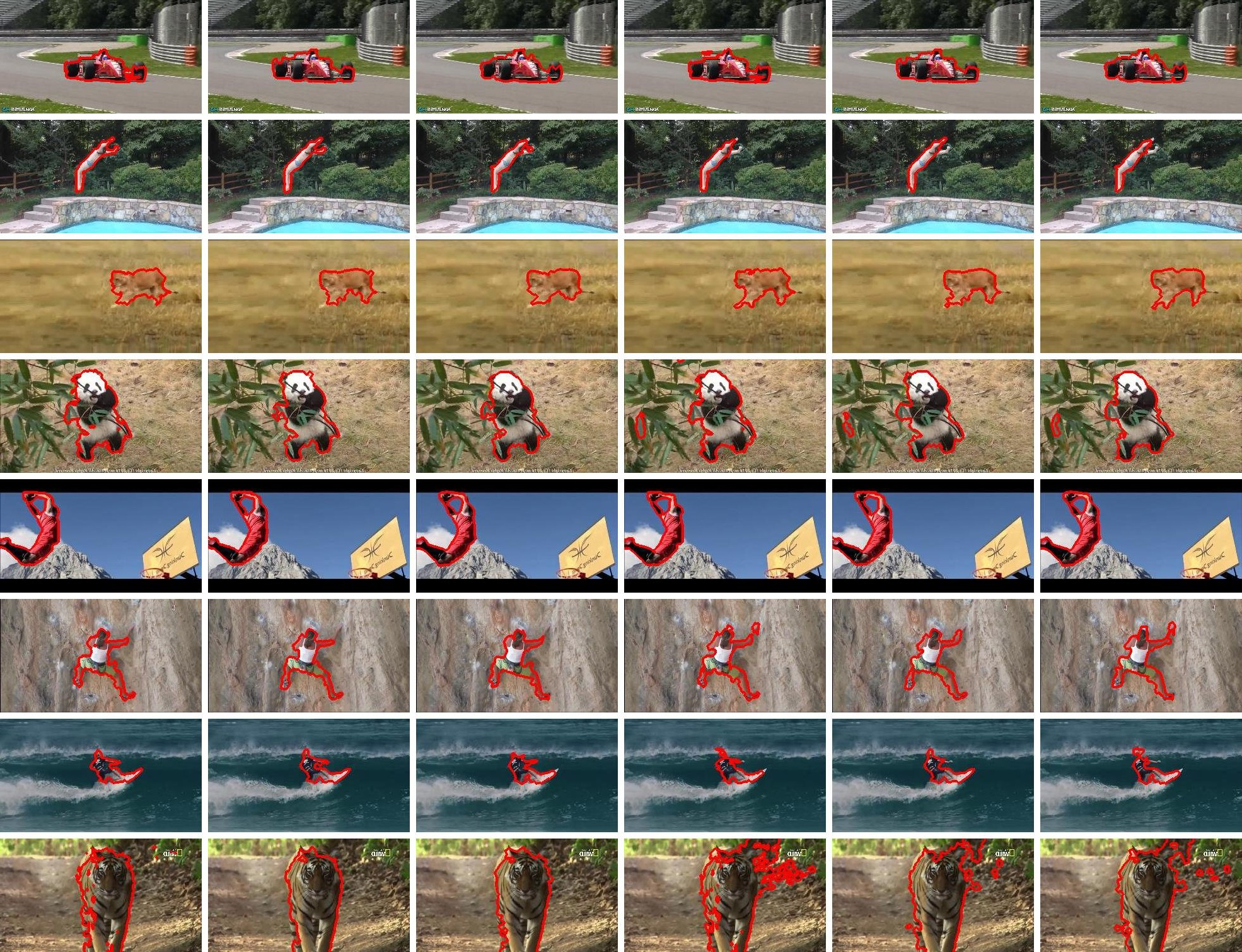
Co-segmentation of objects in video frames

To perform video tracking an algorithm analyzes sequential video frames and outputs the movement of targets between the frames. There are a variety of algorithms, each having strengths and weaknesses. Considering the intended use is important when choosing which algorithm to use. There are two major components of a visual tracking system: target representation and localization, as well as filtering and data association.

Target representation and localization is mostly a bottom-up process. These methods give a variety of tools for identifying the moving object. Locating and tracking the target object successfully is dependent on the algorithm. For example, using blob tracking is useful for identifying human movement because a person's profile changes dynamically. Typically the computational complexity for these algorithms is low. The following are some common target representation and localization algorithms:

- Kernel-based tracking (mean-shift tracking): an iterative localization procedure based on the maximization of a similarity measure (Bhattacharyya coefficient).
- Contour tracking: detection of object boundary (e.g. active contours or Condensation algorithm). Contour tracking methods iteratively evolve an initial contour initialized from the previous frame to its new position in the current frame. This approach to contour tracking directly evolves the contour by minimizing the contour energy using gradient descent.

Filtering and data association is mostly a top-down process, which involves incorporating prior information about the scene or object, dealing with object dynamics, and evaluation of different hypotheses. These methods allow the tracking of complex objects along with more complex object interaction like tracking objects moving behind obstructions. Additionally the complexity is increased if the video tracker (also named TV tracker or target tracker) is not mounted on rigid foundation (on-shore) but on a moving ship (off-shore), where typically an inertial measurement system is used to pre-stabilize the video tracker to reduce the required dynamics and bandwidth of the camera system. The computational complexity for these algorithms is usually much higher. The following are some common filtering algorithms:

- Kalman filter: an optimal recursive Bayesian filter for linear functions subjected to Gaussian noise. It is an algorithm that uses a series of measurements observed over time, containing noise (random variations) and other inaccuracies, and produces estimates of unknown variables that tend to be more precise than those based on a single measurement alone.
- Particle filter: useful for sampling the underlying state-space distribution of nonlinear and non-Gaussian processes.

== See also ==
- Match moving
- Motion capture
- Motion estimation
- Optical flow
- Swistrack
- Single particle tracking
- Teknomo–Fernandez algorithm
