= Salience (neuroscience) =

State or quality by which an item stands out from its neighbors

Salience (also called saliency, from Latin saliō meaning "leap, spring") is the property by which something stands out. Salient events are an attentional mechanism by which organisms learn and survive; those organisms can focus their limited perceptual and cognitive resources on the pertinent (that is, salient) subset of the sensory data available to them.

Saliency typically arises from contrasts between items and their neighborhood. They might be represented, for example, by a red dot surrounded by white dots, or by a flickering message indicator of an answering machine, or a loud noise in an otherwise quiet environment. Saliency detection is often studied in the context of the visual system, but similar mechanisms operate in other sensory systems. Just what is salient can be influenced by training: for example, for human subjects particular letters can become salient by training. There can be a sequence of necessary events, each of which has to be salient, in turn, in order for successful training in the sequence; the alternative is a failure, as in an illustrated sequence when tying a bowline; in the list of illustrations, even the first illustration is a salient: the rope in the list must cross over, and not under the bitter end of the rope (which can remain fixed, and not free to move); failure to notice that the first salient has not been satisfied means the knot will fail to hold, even when the remaining salient events have been satisfied.

When attention deployment is driven by salient stimuli, it is considered to be bottom-up, memory-free, and reactive. Conversely, attention can also be guided by top-down, memory-dependent, or anticipatory mechanisms, such as when looking ahead of moving objects or sideways before crossing streets. Humans and other animals have difficulty paying attention to more than one item simultaneously, so they are faced with the challenge of continuously integrating and prioritizing different bottom-up and top-down influences.

== Neuroanatomy ==
The brain component named the hippocampus helps with the assessment of salience and context by using past memories to filter new incoming stimuli, and placing those that are most important into long term memory. The entorhinal cortex is the pathway into and out of the hippocampus, and is an important part of the brain's memory network; research shows that it is a brain region that suffers damage early on in Alzheimer's disease, one of the effects of which is altered (diminished) salience.

The pulvinar nuclei (in the thalamus) modulate physical/perceptual salience in attentional selection.

One group of neurons (i.e., D1-type medium spiny neurons) within the nucleus accumbens shell (NAcc shell) assigns appetitive motivational salience ("want" and "desire", which includes a motivational component), a.k.a. incentive salience, to rewarding stimuli, while another group of neurons (i.e., D2-type medium spiny neurons) within the NAcc shell assigns aversive motivational salience to aversive stimuli.

The primary visual cortex (V1) generates a bottom-up saliency map from visual inputs to guide reflexive attentional shifts or gaze shifts. According to V1 Saliency Hypothesis, the saliency of a location is higher when V1 neurons give higher responses to that location relative to V1 neurons' responses to other visual locations. For example, a unique red item among green items, or a unique vertical bar among horizontal bars, is salient since it evokes higher V1 responses and attracts attention or gaze. The V1 neural responses are sent to the superior colliculus to guide gaze shifts to the salient locations. A fingerprint of the saliency map in V1 is that attention or gaze can be captured by the location of an eye-of-origin singleton in visual inputs, e.g., a bar uniquely shown to the left eye in a background of many other bars shown to the right eye, even when observers cannot tell the difference between the singleton and the background bars.

== In psychology ==
The term is widely used in the study of perception and cognition to refer to any aspect of a stimulus that, for any of many reasons, stands out from the rest. Salience may be the result of emotional, motivational or cognitive factors and is not necessarily associated with physical factors such as intensity, clarity or size. Although salience is thought to determine attentional selection, salience associated with physical factors does not necessarily influence selection of a stimulus.

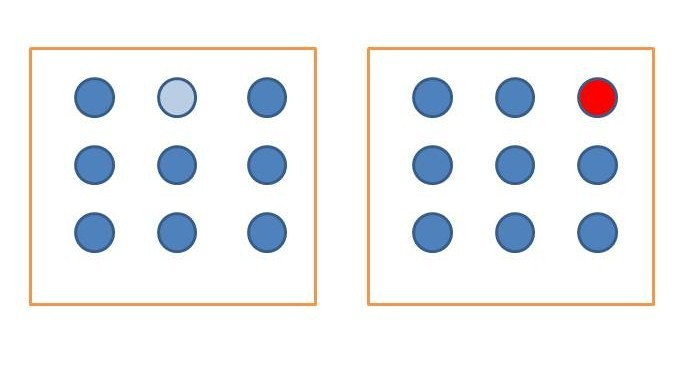
Salience Bias Example: attention is drawn to the second image due to the more prominent color (red), as opposed to the less vivid color (light blue) of the first image, biased to the more salient stimulus.

=== Salience bias ===
Salience bias (also referred to as perceptual salience) is a cognitive bias that predisposes individuals to focus on or attend to items, information, or stimuli that are more prominent, visible, or emotionally striking. This is as opposed to stimuli that are unremarkable, or less salient, even though this difference is often irrelevant by objective standards. The American Psychological Association (APA) defines the salience hypothesis as a theory regarding perception where "motivationally significant" information is more readily perceived than information with little or less significant motivational importance. Perceptual salience (salience bias) is linked to the vividness effect, whereby a more pronounced response is produced by a more vivid perception of a stimulus than the mere knowledge of the stimulus. Salience bias assumes that more dynamic, conspicuous, or distinctive stimuli engage attention more than less prominent stimuli, disproportionately impacting decision making, it is a bias which favors more salient information.

==== Application ====
===== Cognitive Psychology =====
Salience bias, like all other cognitive biases, is an applicable concept to various disciplines. For example, cognitive psychology investigates cognitive functions and processes, such as perception, attention, memory, problem solving, and decision making, all of which could be influenced by salience bias. Salience bias acts to combat cognitive overload by focusing attention on prominent stimuli, which affects how individuals perceive the world as other, less vivid stimuli that could add to or change this perception, are ignored. Human attention gravitates towards novel and relevant stimuli and unconsciously filters out less prominent information, demonstrating salience bias, which influences behavior as human behavior is affected by what is attended to. Behavioral economists Tversky and Kahneman also suggest that the retrieval of instances is influenced by their salience, such as how witnessing or experiencing an event first-hand has a greater impact than when it is less salient, like if it were read about, implying that memory is affected by salience.

===== Language =====
It is also relevant in language understanding and acquisition. Focusing on more salient phenomena allows people to detect language patterns and dialect variations more easily, making dialect categorization more efficient.

===== Social Behavior =====
Furthermore, social behaviors and interactions can also be influenced by perceptual salience. Changes in the perceptual salience of an individual heavily influences their social behavior and subjective experience of their social interactions, confirming a "social salience effect". Social salience relates to how individuals perceive and respond to other people.

===== Behavioral Science =====
The connection between salience bias and other heuristics, like availability and representativeness, links it to the fields of behavioral science and behavioral economics. Salience bias is closely related to the availability heuristic in behavioral economics, based on the influence of information vividness and visibility, such as recency or frequency, on judgements, for example:

Accessibility and salience are closely related to availability, and they are important as well. If you have personally experienced a serious earthquake, you're more likely to believe that an earthquake is likely than if you read about it in a weekly magazine. Thus, vivid and easily imagined causes of death (for example, tornadoes) often receive inflated estimates of probability, and less-vivid causes (for example, asthma attacks) receive low estimates, even if they occur with a far greater frequency (here, by a factor of twenty). Timing counts too: more recent events have a greater impact on our behavior, and on our fears, than earlier ones.

— Richard H. Thaler, Nudge: Improving Decisions about Health, Wealth, and Happiness (2008-04-08)

Humans have bounded rationality, which refers to their limited ability to be rational in decision making, due to a limited capacity to process information and cognitive ability. Heuristics, such as availability, are employed to reduce the complexity of cognitive and social tasks or judgements, in order to decrease the cognitive load that result from bounded rationality. Despite the effectiveness of heuristics in doing so, they are limited by systematic errors that occur, often the result of influencing biases, such as salience. This can lead to misdirected or misinformed judgements, based on an overemphasis or overweighting of certain, more salient information. For example, the irrational behavior of procrastination occurs because costs in the present, like sacrificing free time, are disproportionately salient to future costs, because at that time they are more vivid. The more prominent information is more readily available than the less salient information, and thus has a larger impact on decision making and behavior, resulting in errors in judgement.

Other fields such as philosophy, economics, finance, and political science have also investigated the effects of salience, such as in relation to taxes, where salience bias is applied to real-world behaviors, affecting systems like the economy. The existence of salience bias in humans can make behavior more predictable and this bias can be leveraged to influence behavior, such as through nudges.

==== Evaluation ====
Salience bias is one of many explanations for why humans deviate from rational decision making: by being overly focused on or biased to the most visible data and ignoring other potentially important information that could result in a more reasonable judgment. As a concept it is supported in psychological and economic literature, through its relationship with the availability heuristic outlined by Tversky and Kahneman, and its applicability to behaviors relevant to multiple disciplines, such as economics.

Despite this support, salience bias is limited for various reasons, one example being its difficulty in quantifying, operationalizing, and universally defining. Salience is often confused with other terms in literature, for example, one article states that salience, which is defined as a cognitive bias referring to "visibility and prominence", is often confused with terms like transparency and complexity in public finance literature. This limits salience bias as the confusion negates its importance as an individual term, and therefore the influence it has on tax related behavior. Likewise, the APA definition of salience refers to motivational importance, which is based on subjective judgement, adding to the difficulty. According to psychologist S. Taylor "some people are more salient than others" and these differences can further bias judgements.

Biased judgements have far-reaching consequences, beyond poor decision making, such as overgeneralizing and stereotyping. Studies into solo status or token integration demonstrate this. The token is an individual in a group different to the other members in that social environment, like a female in an all-male workplace. The token is viewed as symbolic of their social group, whereby judgments made about the solo individual predict judgements of their social group, which can result in inaccurate perceptions of that group and potential stereotyping. The distinctiveness of the individual in that environment "fosters a salience bias" and hence predisposes those generalized judgements, positive or negative.

== In interaction design ==
Salience in design draws from the cognitive aspects of attention, and applies it to the making of 2D and 3D objects. When designing computer and screen interfaces, salience helps draw attention to certain objects like buttons and signify affordance, so designers can utilize this aspect of perception to guide users.

There are several variables used to direct attention:

- Color. Hue, saturation, and value can all be used to call attention to areas or objects within an interface, and de-emphasize others.
- Size. Object size and proportion to surrounding elements creates visual hierarchy, both in interactive elements like buttons, but also within informative elements like text.
- Position. An object's orientation or spatial arrangement in relation to the surrounding objects creates differentiation to invite action.

=== Accessibility ===
A consideration for salience in interaction design is accessibility. Many interfaces used today rely on visual salience for guiding user interaction, and people with disabilities like color-blindness may have trouble interacting with interfaces using color or contrast to create salience.

== Aberrant salience hypothesis of schizophrenia ==
Kapur (2003) proposed that a hyperdopaminergic state, at a "brain" level of description, leads to an aberrant assignment of salience to the elements of one's experience, at a "mind" level. These aberrant salience attributions have been associated with altered activities in the mesolimbic system, including the striatum, the amygdala, the hippocampus, the parahippocampal gyrus., the anterior cingulate cortex and the insula. Dopamine mediates the conversion of the neural representation of an external stimulus from a neutral bit of information into an attractive or aversive entity, i.e. a salient event. Symptoms of schizophrenia may arise out of 'the aberrant assignment of salience to external objects and internal representations', and antipsychotic medications reduce positive symptoms by attenuating aberrant motivational salience via blockade of the dopamine D2 receptors (Kapur, 2003).

Alternative areas of investigation include supplementary motor areas, frontal eye fields and parietal eye fields. These areas of the brain are involved with calculating predictions and visual salience. Changing expectations on where to look restructures these areas of the brain. This cognitive repatterning can result in some of the symptoms found in such disorders.

== Visual saliency modeling ==
In the domain of psychology, efforts have been made in modeling the mechanism of human attention, including the learning of prioritizing the different bottom-up and top-down influences.

In the domain of computer vision, efforts have been made in modeling the mechanism of human attention, especially the bottom-up attentional mechanism, including both spatial and temporal attention. Such a process is also called visual saliency detection.

Generally speaking, there are two kinds of models to mimic the bottom-up saliency mechanism. One way is based on the spatial contrast analysis: for example, a center-surround mechanism is used to define saliency across scales, which is inspired by the putative neural mechanism. The other way is based on the frequency domain analysis. While they used the amplitude spectrum to assign saliency to rarely occurring magnitudes, Guo et al. use the phase spectrum instead. Recently, Li et al. introduced a system that uses both the amplitude and the phase information.

A key limitation in many such approaches is their computational complexity leading to less than real-time performance, even on modern computer hardware. Some recent work attempts to overcome these issues at the expense of saliency detection quality under some conditions. Other work suggests that saliency and associated speed-accuracy phenomena may be a fundamental mechanisms determined during recognition through gradient descent, needing not be spatial in nature.

== See also ==
- Availability heuristic – Bias towards recently acquired information
- Dopamine hypothesis of schizophrenia – Scientific model
- Latent inhibition – Psychology term
- Schizophrenia – Mental disorder with psychotic symptoms
- Schizotypy – Concept of personality states ranging from imaginative to psychotic
- Sensationalism – Type of editorial tactic used in mass media
- Visual spatial attention – Visual sense
- Visual temporal attention
