= Catapult Sports =

Australian sports performance analytics company

Catapult Group International Ltd
- Company type: Public
- Traded as: ASX: CAT
- Industry: Sports analytics; Sports science
- Founded: 2006; 20 years ago
- Headquarters: Melbourne, Australia
- Number of locations: 10
- Area served: Worldwide
- Key people: Will Lopes; (Chief Executive Officer); Adir Shiffman; (Executive Chairman); Shaun Holthouse; (Co-Founder); Igor van de Griendt; (Co-Founder); Matt Bairos; (Chief Commercial Officer)
- Products: Wearable technology; Video motion analysis; Athlete management software
- Number of employees: 580
- Website: catapultsports.com

Catapult is a sports performance analytics company, listed on the Australian Securities Exchange. The company is headquartered in Melbourne, Australia.

== History ==
Catapult was founded by engineers Shaun Holthouse and Igor van de Griendt, and is today led by CEO Will Lopes. In 1999 the pair were working with the Cooperative Research Centres during a project with the Australian Institute of Sport seeking to replace laboratory-based performance testing with microtechnology, as athletes were not exerting themselves in lab conditions in the same way as they do in competition. Catapult was launched as a business in 2006 and became a publicly listed company on the Australian Stock Exchange in 2014.

== Products ==
There are three physical products: Catapult Vector S7, T6, and the newly announced T7. Each of these pieces of hardware is worn by athletes to help track different elements of their performances.

ClearSky is a local positioning system Catapult developed with the CSIRO.

Catapult also developed a goalkeeper monitor, the G5, which quantifies the direction and intensity of dives, jumps, accelerations/decelerations, changes of direction, repeat high intensity efforts, and time to recovery.

Through its acquisition of GPSports, XOS Digital, PlayerTek, SportsMedElite and Baseline Athlete Management Systems Catapult now offers video technology and GPS systems for semi-professional sports teams and amateur football players.

== Clients ==
Teams which have used Catapult include Brazil, Ittihad Club, Real Madrid, Chelsea, Saracens and the Australian Cricket Team. Organisations, leagues and governing bodies include the England and Wales Cricket Board, NRL, La Liga, and the XFL.
