= Video motion analysis =

Video motion analysis is a technique used to get information about moving objects from video. Examples of this include gait analysis, sport replays, speed and acceleration calculations and, in the case of team or individual sports, task performance analysis. The motion analysis technique usually involves a high-speed camera and a computer that has software allowing frame-by-frame playback of the video.

== Uses ==
Traditionally, video motion analysis has been used in scientific circles for calculation of speeds of projectiles, or in sport for improving play of athletes. Recently, computer technology has allowed other applications of video motion analysis to surface, including things like teaching fundamental laws of physics to school students, or general educational projects in sport and science.

In sport, systems have been developed to provide a high level of task, performance and physiological data to coaches, teams and players. The objective is to improve individual and team performance and/or analyse opposition patterns of play to give tactical advantage. The repetitive and patterned nature of sports games lends itself to video analysis in that over a period of time real patterns, trends or habits can be discerned.

Police and forensic scientists analyse CCTV video when investigating criminal activity. Police use software, such as Kinesense, which performs video motion analysis to search for key events in video and find suspects.

== Technique ==
A digital video camera is mounted on a tripod. The moving object of interest is filmed doing a motion with a scale in clear view on the camera. Using video motion analysis software, the image on screen can be calibrated to the size of the scale enabling measurement of real world values. The software also takes note of the time between frames to give a movement versus time data set. This is useful in calculating gravity for instance from a dropping ball.

Sophisticated sport analysis systems such as those by Verusco Technologies in New Zealand use other methods such as direct feeds from satellite television to provide real-time analysis to coaches over the Internet and more detailed post game analysis after the game has ended.

== Software ==
There are many commercial packages that enable frame by frame or real-time video motion analysis. There are also free packages available that provide the necessary software functions. These free packages include the relatively old but still functional Physvis, and a relatively new program called PhysMo which runs on Macintosh and Windows. Upmygame is a free online application. VideoStrobe is free software that creates a strobographic image from a video; motion analysis can then be carried out with dynamic geometry software such as GeoGebra.

The objective for video motion analysis will determine the type of software used. Prozone and Amisco are expensive stadium-based camera installations focusing on player movement and patterns. Both of these provide a service to "tag" or "code" the video with the players' actions, and deliver the results after the match. In each of these services, the data is tagged according to the company's standards for defining actions.

Verusco Technologies are oriented more on task and performance and therefore can analyse games from any ground. Focus X2 and Sportscode systems rely on the team performing the analysis in house, allowing the results to be available immediately, and to the team's own coding standards.

MatchMatix takes the data output of video analysis software and analyses sequences of events. Live HTML reports are generated and shared across a LAN, giving updates to the manager on the touchline while the game is in progress.
