= Posner cueing task =

Neuropsychological test used to assess attention

- Purpose: assess focal brain injury

The Posner cueing task, also known as the Posner paradigm, is a neuropsychological test often used to assess attention. Formulated by Michael Posner, it assesses a person's ability to perform an attentional shift. It has been used and modified to assess disorders, focal brain injury, and the effects of both on spatial attention.

== Method ==
Posner's spatial cueing task has been used to measure manual and eye-movement reaction times to target stimuli in order to investigate the effects of covert orienting of attention in response to different cue conditions.

In the general paradigm, observers are seated in front of a computer screen at eye level, and instructed to fixate at a central point on the screen, marked by a dot or cross. To the left and right of the point are two boxes. For a brief period, a cue is presented on the screen. Following a brief interval after the cue is removed, a target stimulus, usually a shape, appears in either the left or right box. The observer must respond to the target immediately after detecting it. To measure reaction time (RT), a response mechanism is placed in front of the observer, usually a computer keyboard which is pressed upon detection of a target. Following a set inter-trial interval, usually between 2500 and 5000 ms, the entire paradigm is repeated for a set number of trials predetermined by the experimenter. The paradigm appears to be very effective in recasting attentional allocation.

Endogenous and exogenous cues in the Posner Paradigm.

=== Cues ===
Two major cue types are used to analyze attention based on the type of visual input. An endogenous cue is presented in the center of the screen, usually at the same place as the center of focus. It is an arrow or other directional cue pointing to the left or right box on the screen. This cue relies on input from the central visual field. An exogenous cue is presented outside the center of focus, usually highlighting the left or right box. An exogenous cue can also be an object or image in the periphery, a number of degrees away from the centre, but still within the visual angle. This cue relies on visual input from the peripheral visual field.

=== Valid and invalid trials ===
Posner devised a scheme of using valid and invalid cues across trials. In valid trials, the stimulus is presented in the area as indicated by the cue. For example, if the cue was an arrow pointing to the right, the subsequent stimulus indeed did appear in the box on the right. Conversely, in invalid trials, the stimulus is presented on the side opposite to that indicated by the cue. In this case, the arrow pointed to the right (directing attention to the right), but the stimulus in fact appeared in the box on the left. Posner used a ratio of 80% valid trials and 20% invalid trials in his original studies. The observer learns that usually the cue is valid, reinforcing the tendency to direct attention to the cued side. Some trials do not present cues prior to presenting the target. These are considered neutral trials. Some tasks use neutral trials that do present cues. These neutral cues give the participant an idea as to when the target will appear, but do not give any indication of which side it is likely to appear on. For example, a neutral cue could be a double-sided arrow. The comparison of performance on neutral, invalid, and valid trials allows for the analysis of whether cues direct attention to a particular area and benefit or hinder attentional performance. Since the participant is not allowed to move their eyes in response to the cue, but remain fixated on the centre of the screen, differences in reaction time between target stimuli preceded by these three cue conditions indicates that covert orienting of attention has been employed.

=== Overt and covert attention ===
In some studies using this paradigm, eye movements are tracked with either video-based eye tracking systems or electric potentials recorded from electrodes positioned around the eye, a process called electrooculography (EOG). This method is used to differentiate overt and covert attention. Overt attention involves directed eye movements, known as saccades, to consciously focus the eye on a target stimulus. Covert attention involves mental focus or attention to an object without significant eye movement, and is the predominant area of interest when using the Posner cueing task for research.

By making 80% trials valid and 20% trials invalid, Posner encourages covert shifts of attention to take place in response to cueing. The ratio makes it beneficial for a participant to covertly shift attention towards the cued location, as it would be an accurate predictor for the majority of the time, giving rise to quicker target detection and response.

When we attend to a location, even without directly looking at it, it facilitates processing and decreases the time we need to respond to information occurring in that given space. This results in decreased reaction times in Posner's spatial cueing task for validly cued targets, and slower reaction times in response to invalidly cued targets: "Detection latencies are reduced when subjects receive a cue that indicates where in the visual field the signal will occur" (Posner, Snyder & Davidson, 1980).

Covert shifts of attention do not only decrease reaction time. They also result in more intense processing of stimuli, and increase the probability of an individual detecting a near-threshold event occurring in the periphery (such as a slight lighting up of a box in the periphery, that may not have been noticed had attention been elsewhere).

=== Stimulus onset asynchronies ===
The time interval in between the onset of the cue and the onset of the target is defined as the stimulus onset asynchrony (SOA). Previous studies using this spatial cueing task found that in addition to cue validity, behavioural reactions were also affected by SOA. The effect of the SOA varies depending on whether a central or peripheral cue is used.

== Experimental findings ==
Variations of the Posner cueing task have been used in many studies to assess the effect of focal damage or disorders on attentional ability as well as to better understand spatial attention in healthy people. The following findings are only a few of the many results that have been established through the use of the Posner cueing task:

- Attentional shift to a target area occurs prior to any eye movement
- Spatial attention is not completely reliant on conscious visual input
- There are three mental operations that occur during covert orienting: disengagement of current focus, movement to selected target, and engagement of selected target
- Injury to areas of the midbrain and Parkinson's disease affect orienting ability in directions in which eye movements are impaired
- Parietal lobe damage affects the ability to orient and detect targets from invalid trials (where targets are presented on the opposite site that is directed by the cue)
- Children with attention deficit hyperactivity disorder have slower reaction times in both valid and invalid trials than do typically developing children, especially to targets presented in the left visual field. Like typically developing children however, they performed better on valid trials than invalid trials.
- It is mostly held that endogenous and exogenous visual spatial attention are subserved by strongly interacting, yet separable neural networks, although some researchers suggest that exogenous and endogenous attention shifts are mediated by the same fronto-parietal network, consisting of the premotor cortex, posterior parietal cortex, medial frontal cortex and right inferior frontal cortex.
- Cued attention is affected by age: older observers show longer engagement and delayed disengagement from cues compared to younger observers, who show increased ability in attentional shifting and disengagement relative to older observers.
- Reorientation of attention to objects in a 3D space is related to proximity and unexpectedness
