= Heydar (robot) =

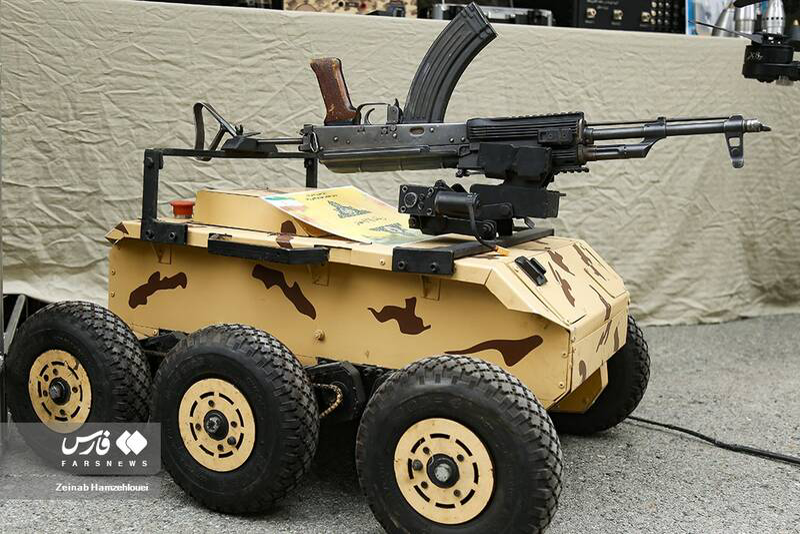
- Iran Unveils New Military Heydar
- Type: Unmanned ground vehicle
- Place of origin: Iran

Service history
- In service: 2019–present
- Used by: Islamic Republic of Iran Army Ground Forces

Production history
- Designer: Islamic Republic of Iran Army Ground Forces
- Manufacturer: Islamic Republic of Iran Army Ground Forces
- Variants: Logistics, Combat, ISR, EOD

Specifications
- Main armament: MG, MG, Remote controlled, ATGM, loitering munition launcher (Combat variant), Reconnaissance scout
- Engine: Turbojet
- Payload capacity: 40 kg (88 lb)
- Drive: Tracked
- Operational range: 30 km (19 mi)
- Maximum speed: 60 km/h (37 mph)

Heydar (Persian: حیدر) is an Iranian Robot combat developed by the Islamic Republic of Iran Army Ground Forces (NEZAJA) and unveiled on 3 October 2019.

== Name ==
The name Heydar is commonly found in Persian, Turkish, and Arabic cultures and holds a deep significance connected to strength and valor. In Arabic, it means “lion,” representing bravery, leadership, and nobility. This name is often associated with strong and courageous individuals and has traditionally been used as a mark of honor and respect. Additionally, it is recognized as one of the titles of Ali, the first Imam in Shia Islam and the fourth Rashidun Caliphate in Sunni Islam.

== Specifications ==
On 3 October 2019, NEZAJA introduced Heydar, a new AI-powered tactical robot designed for Combat support, Reconnaissance, and Demolition tasks. This versatile unmanned ground vehicle (UGCV) was fully developed by Iranian engineers for use in field operations. Heydar can rotate 360 degrees and operate in different roles, including serving as a machine gun platform, a mobile unit carrying explosives, or a reconnaissance device. It is equipped with daytime cameras along with systems compatible with night vision and thermal imaging. The robot is designed for missions such as surveillance, Suicide operations, fire support, and other multi-purpose field operations. With its development, Iran became part of the exclusive group of countries with advanced ground robotics technology.

== See also ==
- Iran Aria combat robot
- THeMIS
- Type-X
