= Iran Aria combat robot =

Aria
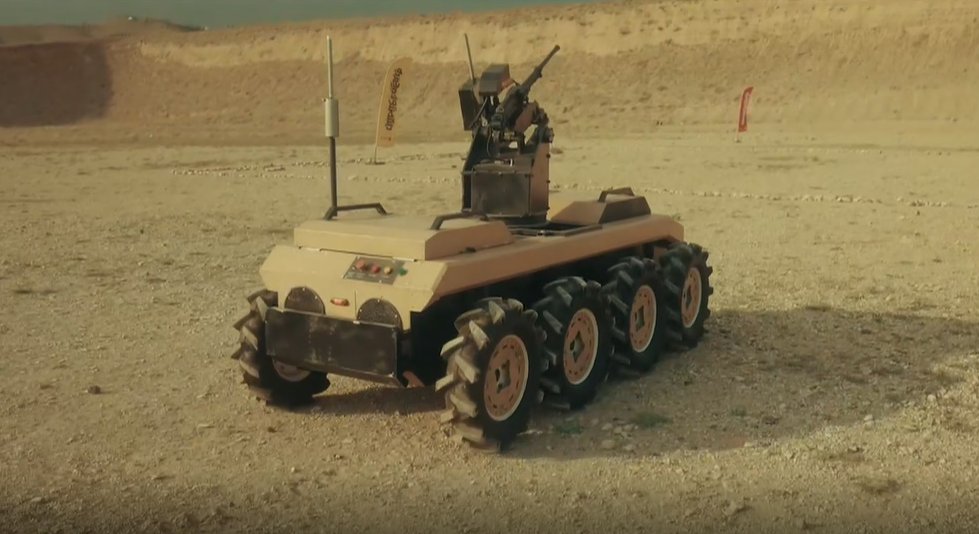
- Iran unveils "Aria" combat robot
- Type: Unmanned ground vehicle
- Place of origin: Iran

Service history
- In service: 2025–present
- Used by: Islamic Republic of Iran Army Ground Forces

Production history
- Designer: Islamic Republic of Iran Army Ground Forces
- Manufacturer: Islamic Republic of Iran Army Ground Forces
- Variants: Logistics, Combat, ISR, EOD

Specifications
- Main armament: LMG, 7.62 mm MG, Remote controlled, ATGM, loitering munition launcher (Combat variant)
- Engine: Internal combustion engine
- Drive: Tracked
- Ground clearance: 200 cm (79 in)
- Operational range: 2 km (1.2 mi)
- Maximum speed: 50 km/h (31 mph)

Aria (Persian: آریا) is an Iranian combat robot developed by the Islamic Republic of Iran Army Ground Forces and unveiled on 16 September 2025.

== Name ==
The name Aria or Arya is primarily a gender-neutral name of Persian origin that means Friend, Faithful. The term Aria or Arya appears as early as the Avesta, where it was used by both the people of Iran and their rulers and emperors. Starting from the Sasanian era (226–651 CE), the name Iran—meaning "Land of the Aryans"—and its extended form Iranshahr were officially used to refer to the kingdom.

== Specifications ==
On September 16, 2025, the Iranian Army introduced Aria, a new tactical combat and reconnaissance robot outfitted with artificial intelligence. This versatile unmanned ground combat vehicle (UGCV) was fully designed and developed by Iranian engineers for battlefield operations. Aria operates remotely on an 8×8 platform and is armed with a 7.62 mm machine gun capable of engaging targets up to 2 kilometers away. It is meant for roles such as reconnaissance, surveillance, fire support, and direct combat missions.

== See also ==
- Iran Heydar combat robot
- THeMIS
- Type-X
