= Brave1 =

Ukrainian program to develop weapons

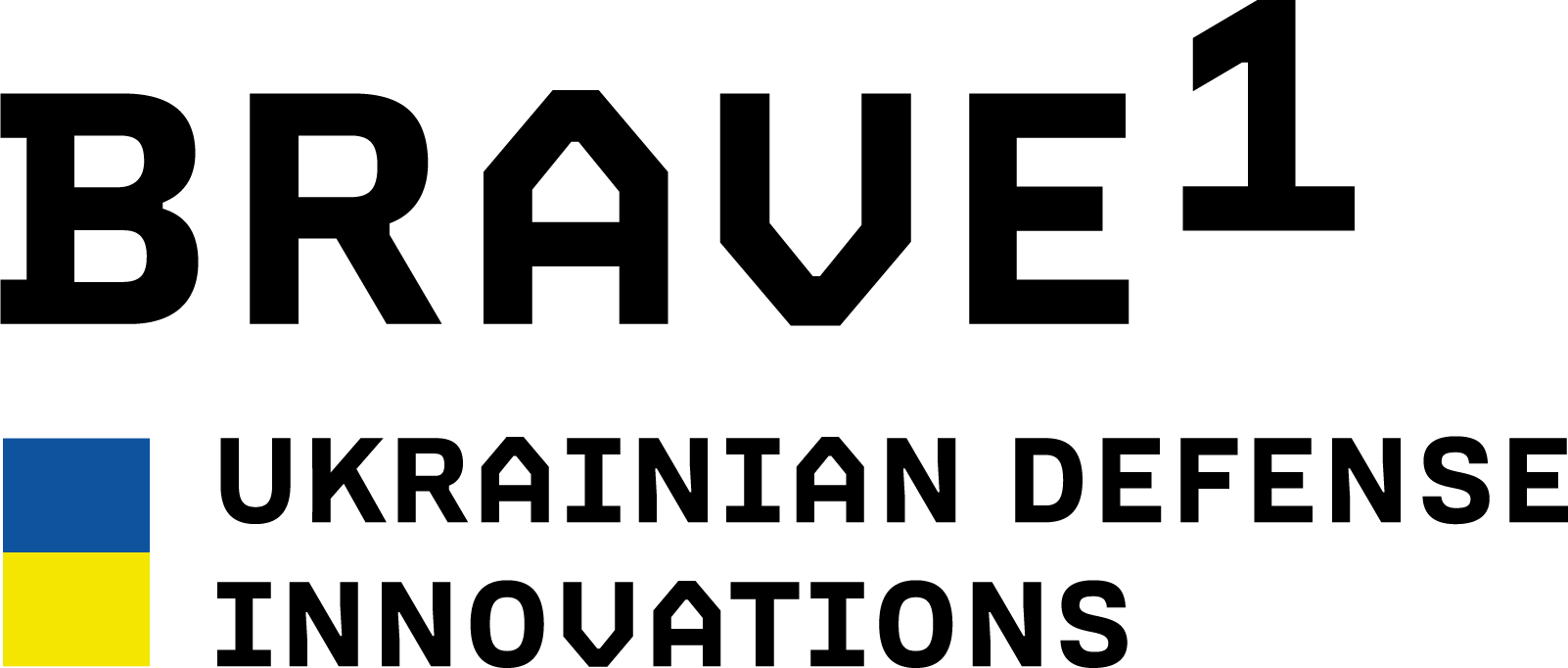
- Founded: 26 April 2023; 3 years ago
- Founder: Ministry of Digital Transformation of Ukraine; Ministry of Defense of Ukraine; General Staff of the Armed Forces of Ukraine; National Security and Defense Council of Ukraine; Ministry of Strategic Industries of Ukraine; Ministry of Economy of Ukraine
- Website: https://brave1.gov.ua

Brave1 is a Ukrainian government platform launched on 26 April 2023, with the aim of bringing together innovative companies with ideas and developments for use in Ukraine's defense against Russia's ongoing military invasion.

By early 2024, more than 1,000 companies, including designers, manufacturers, and finance companies, were actively using the platform. By mid-2026, the one-time grant program had transformed into: "the largest angel investor in Ukrainian defense tech, having issued over 750 grants amounting to 3.7 billion UAH"... while "consolidat[ing] the efforts of government, security and defense forces, the scientific community, and business to create technologies that change the course of the war" while also ... "support[ing] technologies at every stage—from analytics and the formation of technical specifications for defense manufacturers to combat testing and the implementation of advanced technologies into the military through Brave1 Market."

== Funding ==
Initial funding of 100 million hryvnias (about $2.7 million) was provided at launch. The budget for 2024 is 1.5 billion hryvnias ($39 million).

== Organization ==
=== Mission ===
Brave1's founding aim was to bring together experts who could turn ideas and prototypes into workable weapons the Armed Forces of Ukraine could use within weeks, rather than months or years.

=== Method of operation ===
The Ministry of Defense, Ministry of Strategic Industries, Ministry of Economy, the National Security and Defense Council, the General Staff of the Armed Forces, and the Ministry of Digital Transformation have all been actively involved in Brave1's work. Ideas are considered by all interested parties who then allocate a priority rating to the idea. Ideas given top priority are immediately fast-tracked to certification.

=== Leadership ===
COO Iryna Zabolotna leads the organization by connecting inventors with designers, scientists, manufacturers, and key military personnel. This is achieved by providing all stakeholders with an accessible secure platform, which then facilitates:

- Investment — Grants to developers prioritized for security and defense needs;
- Invention – Effective solutions to problems determined by security and defense forces;
- Innovation – Maximum exposure showcasing innovators to the military; and
- Priority projects – Expediting projects as circumstances dictate.

=== Results ===
- August 2023 — 30 out of approximately 200 projects that had received military testing had either received $US15–20,000 in funding or were about to receive it.
- September 2023 — Brave1 gave a presentation at the first International Forum of Defense Industries (DFNC1) held in Kyiv, attended by 252 companies from 30 countries and held a panel discussion moderated by the COO of Brave1.
- October 2023 — 57 projects covering areas such as Unmanned Aerial Vehicles (UAV) or drones, Unmanned Ground Vehicles (UGV), Uncrewed Underwater Vehicles (UUV) and Uncrewed Surface Vessels (USV), as well as robotic systems, situational awareness centers, artificial intelligence, cyber security, communication systems and satellite data had received funding of $US1 million through Brave1. Priority status has also been given to 294 projects.
- November 2023 — Applications rose to 780 applications with 420 approvals and 84 grants worth $1.53 million given.
- December 2023 —Applications rose to 877, grants rose to 135, with funds given amounting to $2.35m.

== Brave1-accredited MilTech ==
=== Electronic warfare (EW) ===
- Himera Tech has designed and tested, on the battlefield, jam-resistant personal radio handsets using an encryption system, controlled using a mobile phone app.
- Power Kit makes power packs to recharge electronic gear used by soldiers using discarded electronic cigarettes.
- ETER is a small, mobile mix of electronic detection systems designed to both identify enemy signals and accurately trace the direction from which they come, effectively revealing the location of enemy electronic warfare transmitters and the launch location of drones.
- A system named Griselda aimed at collecting chaotic intelligence information, then processing, enriching, analysing and transmitting the resulting intelligent information, using AI technology.
- Piranha AVD 360 is an electronic system designed to protect armoured vehicles from drone attack by creating an area up to 600m from the small device, within which drones cannot receive command signals with satellite navigation systems also disrupted.
- A UAV drone detector has been developed by Kseonics Technology that detects the frequency of drones.
- AD Counter FPV system is a portable 3 kg backpack that produces white noise within a frequency range to block control of FPV (first person view) drones with a 250m radius when the drone operator is 3 km away.

=== Equipment ===
- The development of an “invisibility cloak” is helping front line soldiers, especially snipers and special services. The cloak, whilst being camouflaged and waterproof, has an ability to block heat radiation, making the person invisible to thermal imaging.
- Armoured wheels designed for light vehicle tyres, an insert that will allow the vehicle to be driven, after the wheel is damaged or tyre punctured by turning the tyre into a run-flat.

=== Health ===
- Anima software designers have created a package to assist the diagnosis of depression, anxiety and stress using a camera monitoring eye movement to detect reaction as pictures are shown to the patient.

=== Security and intelligence ===
- A platform for collating open source intelligence (OSINT) has been created called Kolossal by DeepstateUA, to collect and process very large amounts of OSINT data and turn it into simple and understandable information.

=== Situational awareness ===
- The FSV Platform, developed by Brave1 member Farsight Vision, uses AI to generate high-precision 2D and 3D terrain models from UAV imagery in GPS-denied environments. The system supports integration with platforms like Delta and Kropyva, and includes tools for photogrammetry, navigation, and VR-based terrain exploration.

=== Unmanned aerial vehicles (UAV) ===
Building on the work already undertaken by United24 in raising funds for supplying drones to the Army of Drones, Brave1 seeks to manufacture drones in Ukraine suitable for front line usage.

- The Saker UAV Scout drone can use artificial intelligence (AI) target detection, including camouflage, with automatic transmission of target coordination, working in areas where Russian electronic warfare defense blocks normal drones. It was approved in September 2023.
- Airlogix drones for surveillance with autonomous mode and encrypted communications with protection against signal interference.
- Mini Shark reconnaissance UAV drone produced by Ukrspecsystems with a 2-hour flight and 35 km radius of operation, used for target detection using a 10x zoom optical-electronic camera.
- Sirko reconnaissance UAV by Skyassist, with a range of 65 km and the ability to stream videos at 25 km from the operator helps locate and then correct fire onto targets. Sirko-2 has an increased range of 140 km providing remote fire correction.
- A drone mine detector, ST-1 autonomously searches for mines and works, on average, four times faster than a human. With a sensor to avoid objects and allow the drone to fly at very low levels.
- Backfire attack drone, designed to be highly resistant to Russian electronic warfare efforts with a range of 35 km. Used 50 times successfully under battlefield conditions to attack artillery, command centres and ammunition dumps as a test, which it passed and is in mass production mode.
- Yaschyr land mine drone, operational range 3 km, designed to deliver surface mines.

=== Unmanned ground vehicles (UGV) ===
- The THeMIS by Milrem Robotics, an unmanned ground evacuation vehicle is designed to collect a casualty from a forward position where a normal ambulance could risk the crew the tracked vehicle is controlled remotely.
- One of the first idea applications, the Liut, an armoured wheeled robot is controlled remotely, it is capable of manoeuvring and has an automatic targeting system and 360 degree camera. It can fire its mounted tank machine gun at the enemy before being returned to the controller, meaning that the operator is capable of inflicting damage from a relatively safe distance. It was given priority and within two months the first working models were being tested on the front line.
- Temerland is trialing an "iron caterpillar" that uses a robotic vehicle with a cheap disposable mine activation roller as a form of all terrain mine activator.
- Ratel S (or honey badger) was designed to allow an accurate strike to be made from a safe distance. A small fast wheeled robot that carries an anti-tank mine or bomb and can be directed against a fortification or enemy vehicle up to 6 km away and detonated remotely. The vehicle can also be used to transport 100 kg of ammunition to front lines, it has a top speed of 24kph and climbs over 25 cm high obstacles. On 2 April 2024 Ukrainian forces claimed to have blown up a bridge in Ivanivske (near Bakhmut), that the Russians were using for logistics, using a Ratel S.
- SkyLabUA built the Sirko-S robot which has universal uses and can be remotely controlled to transport 200 kg of supplies to the front line and return with a wounded man, if necessary. Fitted with thermal cameras to assist night time movement, the vehicle costs around $8,000 to make.
- D-21-11 universal ground robot capable of carrying detachable cargo units.
- D-11 static ground robot using D-21-11 base with a machine gun turret.
- Volta-E cargo delivery vehicle, 90cmx110cmx40cm, can carry 300 kg but recommended for 100–150 kg and can move 12 km on one charge. Radio controlled crawler.
- Partner-VS crawler de-miner, designed to take a lineal de-mining charge through a minefield, with the line then exploded to clear a path.

=== Unmanned underwater vehicle (UUV) ===
- A maritime drone, called Toloka TLK-150 is a small robotic submarine, 2.5 m (8 ft 2 in) long with twin thrusters mounted on wing-like stabilizers designed as a one direction drone, already in prototype form in May 2023, it is now in operation fitted with a High-explosive anti-tank (HEAT) warhead. Capable of a range around 100 km and a payload of 20–50 kg, the drone which travels just below the surface, can be a suicide weapon or intelligence gathering drone.
- Plans for the Toloka TLK-400, which is longer at 4–6 m (13–20 ft) still with 2 thrusters and a 700+ mile (1260+ km) range and payload of 1,100 pounds [500 kg).
- The Toloka TLK-1000 is planned at 4–12 m (13–39 ft) with 4 thrusters and a range of 1200+ miles (2160+ km) with a payload of 11,000 pounds 5000 kg).

=== Weapons ===
- Developed by devDroid, the weapon comprises a remotely controlled turret TGP that uses AI for enemy detection and engagement. When placed in a trench, the system will wait, then identify, track and engage an enemy by raising itself up, before retracting below visible levels. The droid is trained to recognise enemies and has a remote operator who is not needed to control the fight.
- ShaBlya by Roboneers, is a remotely controlled fire complex designed to install on UGV vehicles and objects, such as forward sentry positions and is controlled remotely.
