= Roboneers =

Ukrainian military technology company

- Industry: military technology
- Headquarters: Lviv, Ukraine
- Area served: Ukraine
- Key people: Anton Skrypnyk; Oleksiy Skrypnyk
- Website: roboneers.net

Roboneers is a Ukrainian company that develops ground-based robotic systems. It is a member of the IT Ukraine Association. The company's products include the "ShaBlya" turret, the Ironclad ground combat drone, and the "Rys" and "Camel" platforms.

== History ==
=== Early development (2014–2016) ===
In 2014, when the Russo-Ukrainian War began, various volunteer groups started developing robotic products and software. One of these groups, the volunteer organization Night&Gale Defense Group, worked on the development of the remote-controlled turret "ShaBlya". In 2014, funds for the first unit were raised through crowdfunding by the organization People's Project. This remote-controlled turret became one of the first robotic systems deployed on the frontline.

=== Formation of Roboneers (2017–2021) ===
In 2017, volunteers united under the Roboneers project, a division of the company Global Dynamics. The main investor in the project was Oleksii Skrypnyk, a co-founder of the Ukrainian IT company ELEKS, scientist, and public figure. He invested at least $2 million in Roboneers.

From 2016 to 2021, the company participated in the annual exhibition Arms and Security. In 2018, the company developed the first prototype of the Ironclad ground combat robot. In 2021, the "Ironclad" and "Camel" drones were showcased in Kyiv during the military parade for Ukraine's Independence Day.

=== Russian invasion (2022–present) ===
After the start of the Russian invasion of Ukraine (2022–present), the company donated up to 200 various robotic systems to the frontline free of charge. In 2022, Anton Skrypnyk became the head of Roboneers. He is an investor, founder, and CEO of the Ukrainian IT company Kindgeek.

In 2024, the company participated in a grant program by Brave1.

== Products ==
=== "ShaBlya" ===
The ShaBlya remote-controlled combat module is a turret designed for 7.62 mm caliber PKT, M240, or M2 machine guns. It was one of the first robotic systems deployed on the frontline. Since 2014, some units of the Armed Forces of Ukraine have been using it. It was previously known as "Tur". Since 2023, it has been in service with the Da Vinci Wolves Battalion.

This turret helps Ukrainian forces establish defensive lines and eliminate enemy personnel and lightly armored targets. As of 2024, approximately 200 ShaBlya modules were in use on the frontline. In active combat zones, each turret eliminates over 100 enemy soldiers per month.

=== Ground Robotic Systems ===
"Ironclad", "Camel", and "Rys" are ground robotic systems (GRS) designed for logistics, evacuation, and combat operations.

==== Ironclad ====
"Ironclad" is a ground combat drone equipped with a thermal imaging camera and a ShaBlya M2 combat turret. It can reach speeds of up to 12 km/h and carry up to 350 kg of payload. The robot is capable of performing reconnaissance, assaulting enemy positions, and logistics missions. It is remotely controlled.

The first prototype was introduced in 2018. Since then, the drone has been showcased regularly at the Arms and Security exhibitions, further developed, and proposed for adoption by the Armed Forces of Ukraine. In May 2021, the Air Assault Forces Command evaluated the drone, and in August 2021, it passed trials by the Ministry of Defense of Ukraine.

This is a revolutionary product from Ukrainian engineers at Roboneers, changing the approach to warfare and helping to preserve the most valuable asset—our soldiers' lives.

— Mykhailo Fedorov, Deputy Prime Minister and Minister of Digital Transformation.

At 'Arms and Security' exhibitions

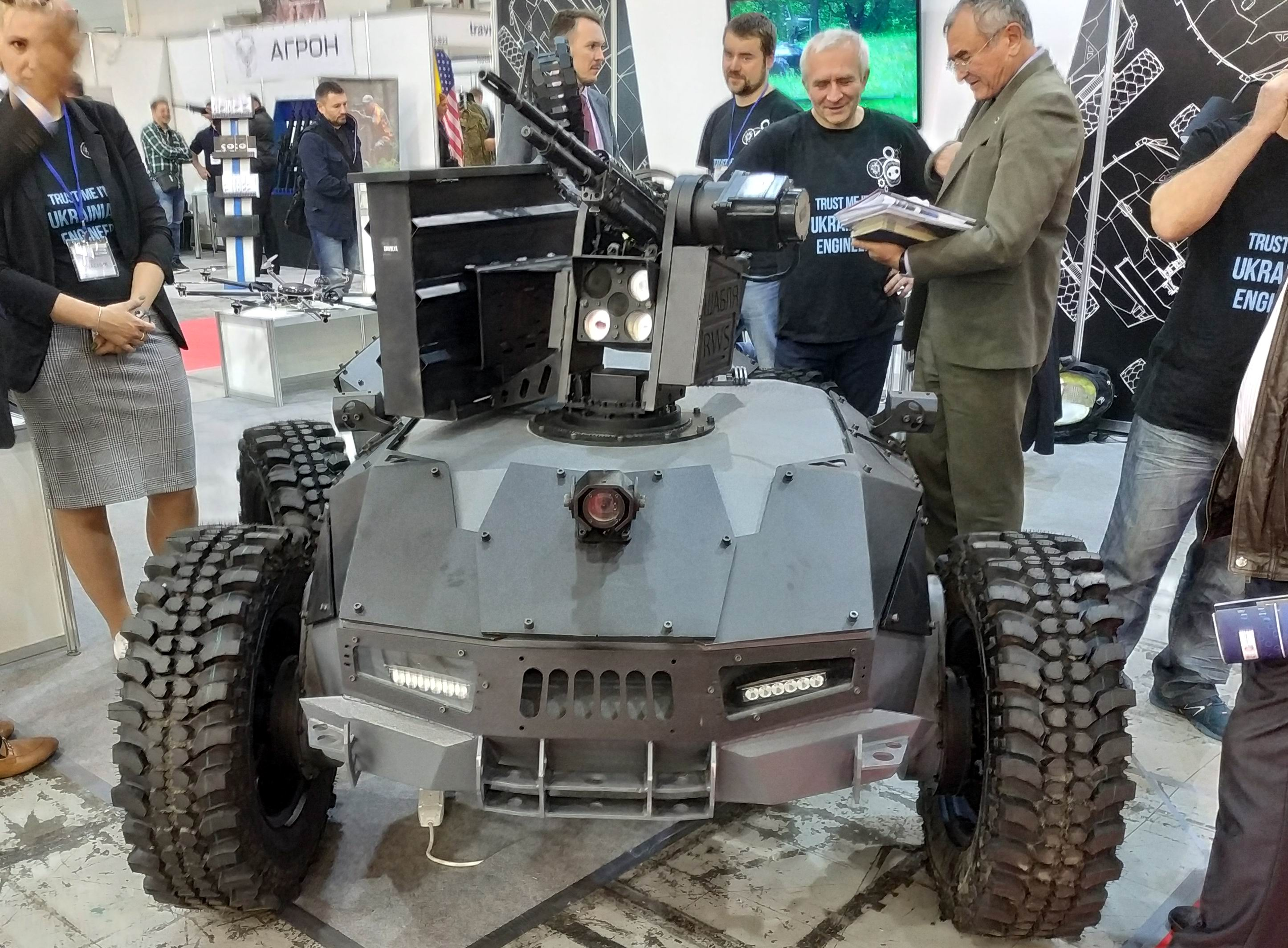
2018

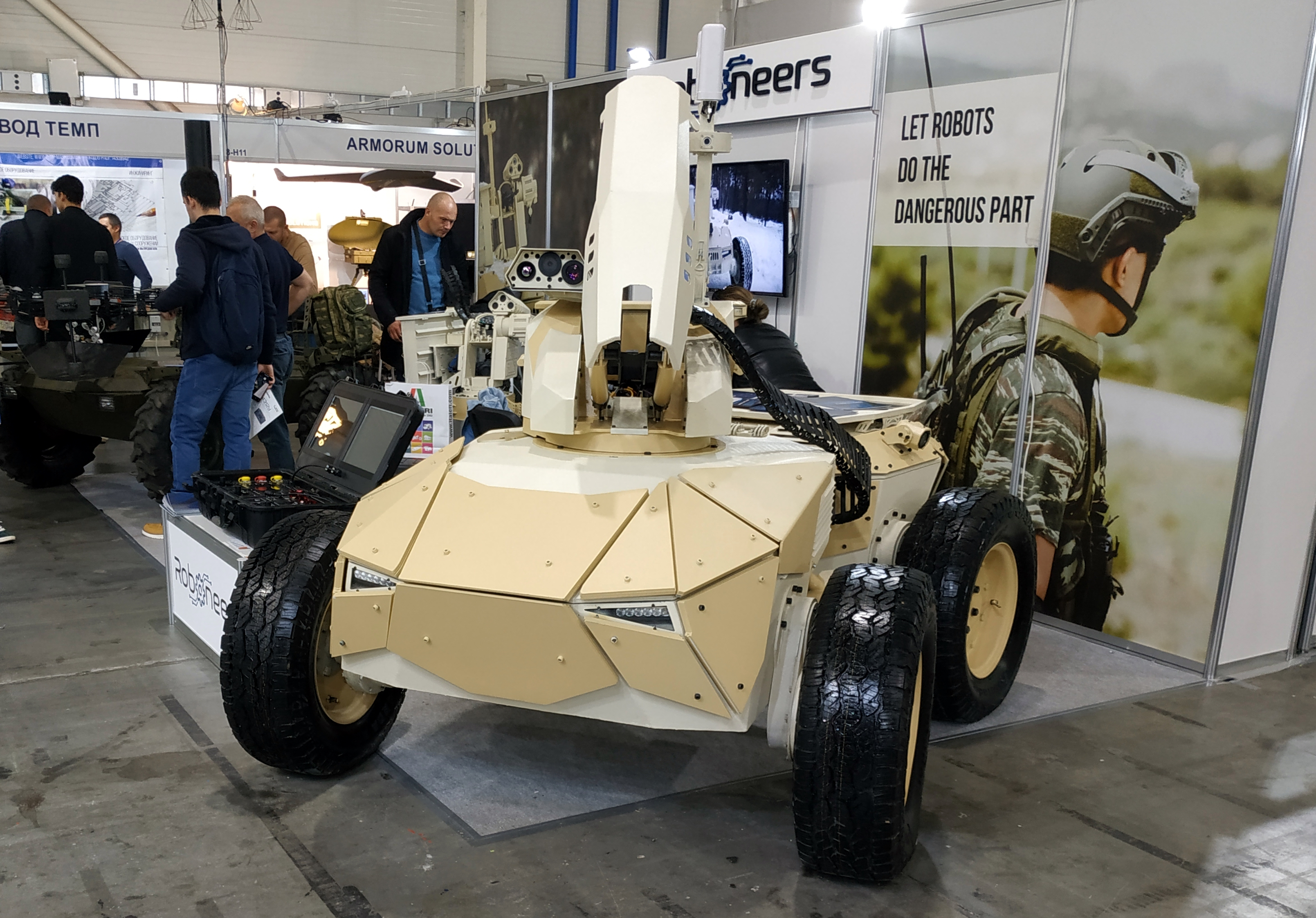
2019

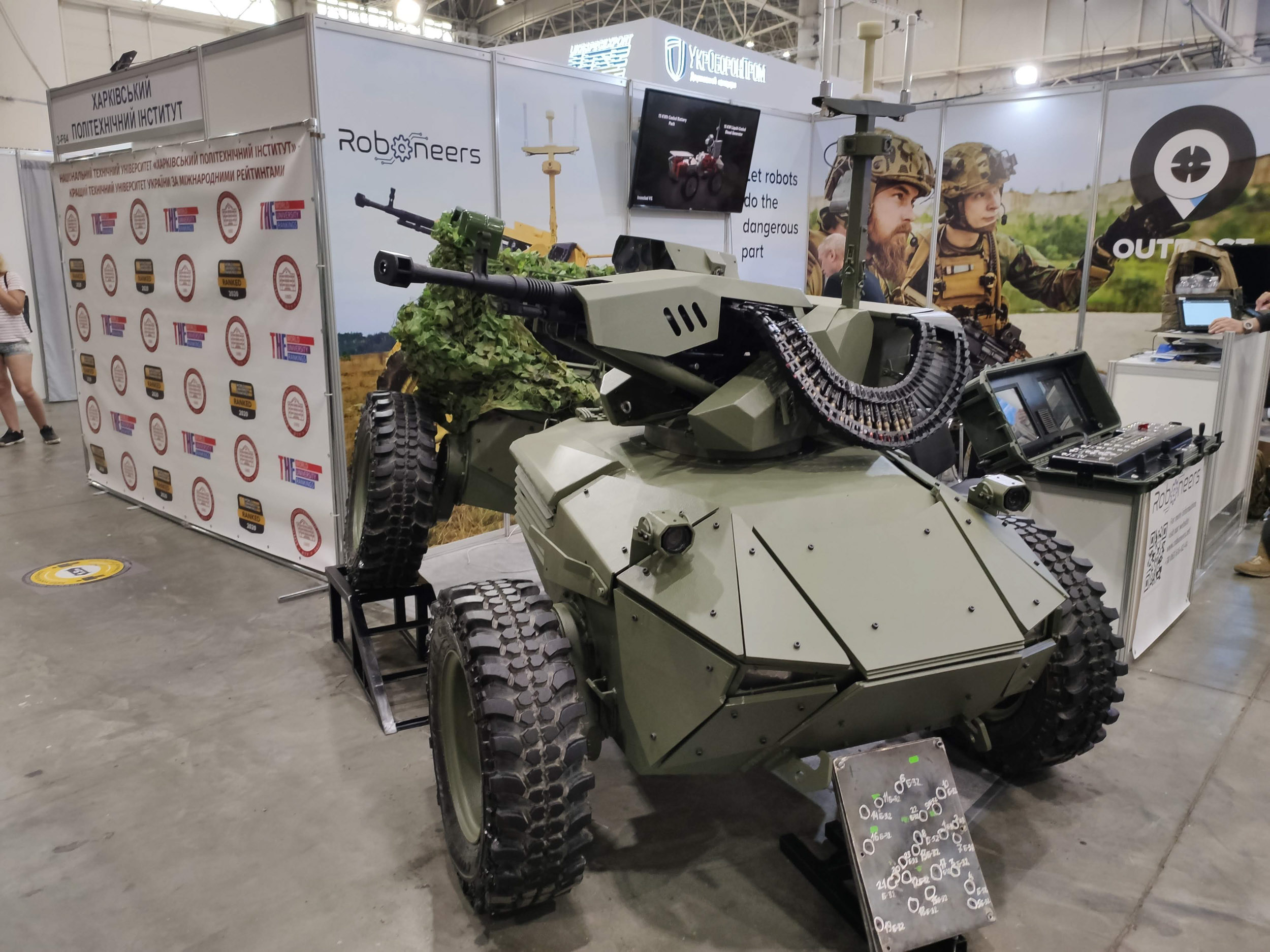
2021

==== Camel ====
"Camel" is a remotely controlled platform designed for various tasks, including enemy detection and elimination, equipment transport, reconnaissance operations, and destroying armored enemy targets. In 2020, the platform was successfully tested at the State Research and Testing Institute for Weapons and Military Equipment Certification.

==== Rys ====
"Rys" is a ground robotic system that assists in evacuating soldiers from the battlefield and transporting weapons and supplies. There are two modifications:

- Rys – can carry up to 150 kg.
- Rys PRO – can carry up to 300 kg.

==== ShaBrys ====
"ShaBrys" is a hybrid system consisting of:

- "ShaBlya" – a machine-gun turret.
- "Rys" – a logistics platform for carrying cargo or personnel. The system operates at a range of up to 1 km, and its cost varies between $25,000 to $40,000.

=== Outpost ===
Outpost is a situational awareness system. Roboneers' robotic systems are equipped with C4Vision software.

== Links ==
- Official website
