= Milrem Robotics =

Company based in Estonia

- Founded: 2013
- Founder: Kuldar Väärsi
- Headquarters: Tallinn, Estonia
- Website: milremrobotics.com

Milrem Robotics is an Estonian defense technology company specializing in robotic and autonomous systems for military and security applications. Founded in 2013 and headquartered in Tallinn, it develops modular, AI-enabled unmanned ground vehicles, used for reconnaissance, transport, and combat support. Its main production facility is in Tallinn, Estonia, capable of manufacturing over 500 THeMIS unmanned ground vehicle units per year. The company also operates R&D and engineering subsidiaries in Finland, the Netherlands, Poland, Sweden, and the United States, focusing on design, testing, and regional support. Milrem Robotics is majority-owned by the UAE’s EDGE Group

== History ==
Milrem Robotics was established in 2013. Development on the first unmanned ground vehicle (UGV) began late 2014. The first UGV (THeMIS) was introduced at DSEI 2015 in London. An upgraded THeMIS was introduced at the 2019 Defence and Security Equipment International conference.

In 2019 the Estonian Defence Forces deployed the THeMIS UGV to a combat zone, Mali, for the first time as part of a French led counter-terrorism Operation Barkhane.

In December 2023, after testing the system through Ukraine's Brave1 innovation system, Milrem signed an agreement with the Ukrainian Defense Industry to start development and production of robotic defense systems.

In August 2026 an arson attack took place on Milrem's facilities, with little damage and no casualties. Based on intelligence reports the Estonian government accused that it was a Russian attack as part of its hybrid warfare against Europe.

== Product lines ==
=== THeMIS ===
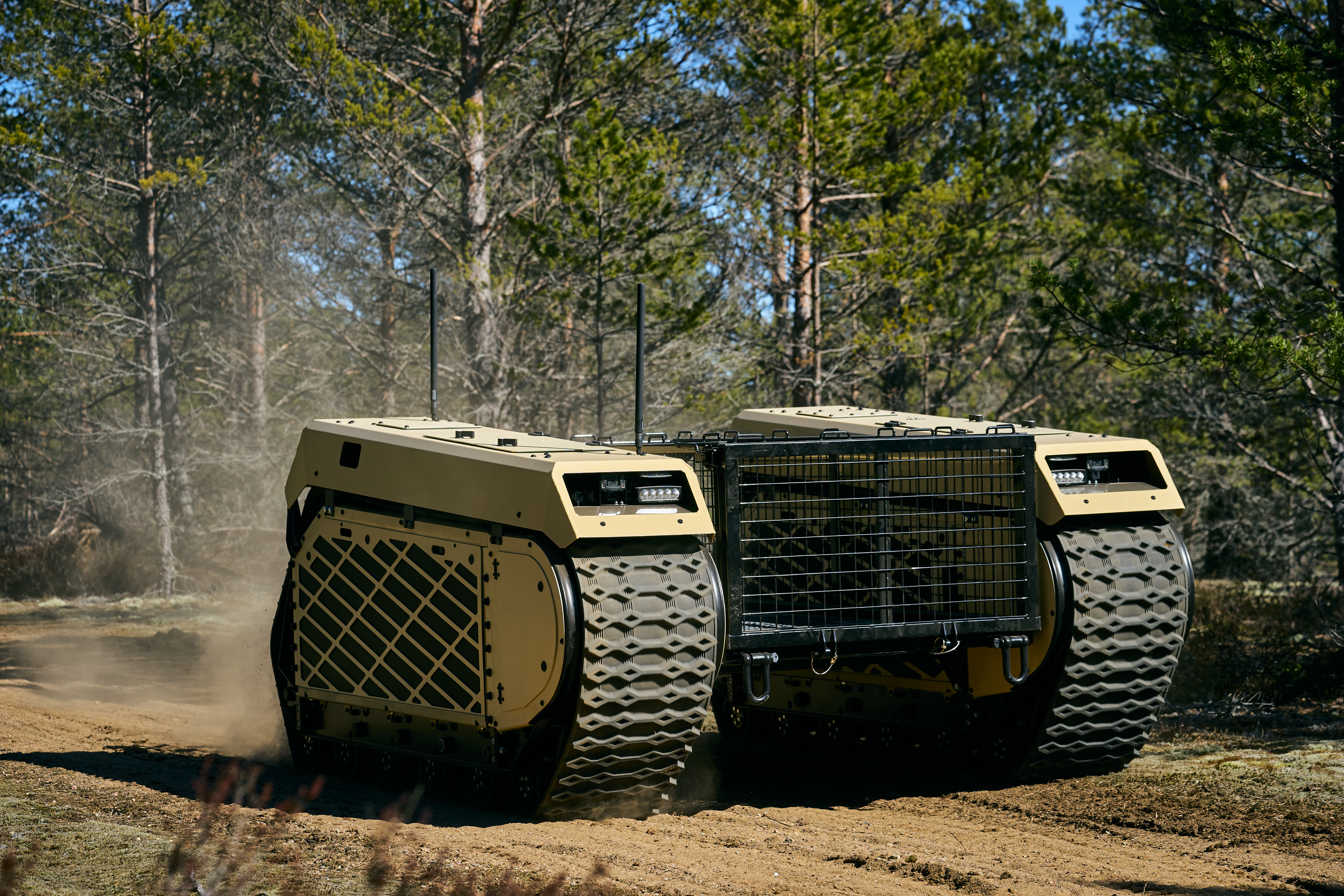
THeMIS unmanned ground vehicle produced by Milrem Robotics

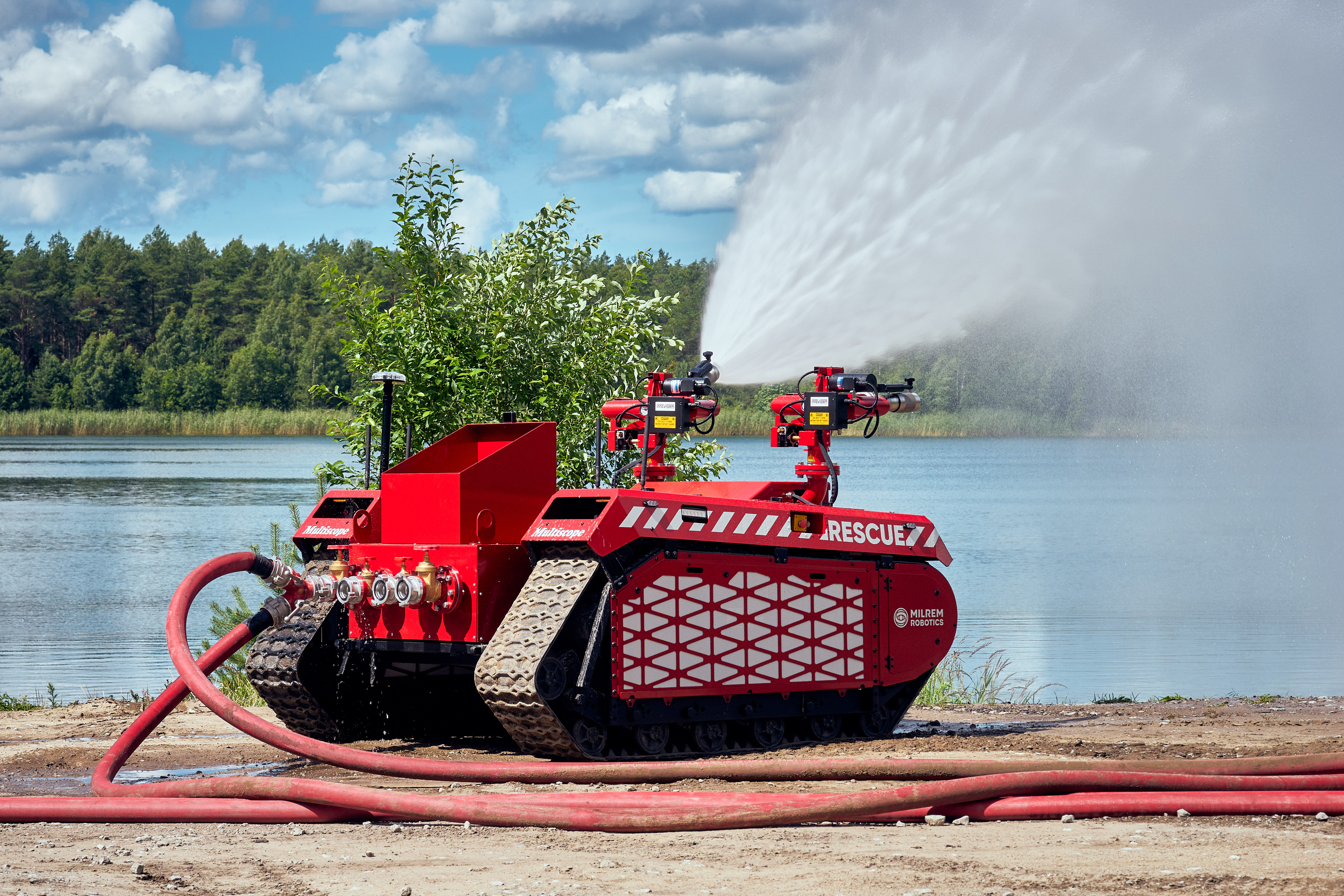
Multiscope Rescue with the Hydra firefighting payload from InnoVfoam

The THeMIS is a medium-sized military UGV intended to provide support for dismounted troops by serving as a transport platform, remote weapon station, IED detection and disposal unit etc. The vehicle’s open architecture gives it multi-missions capability. The THeMIS has been integrated with a number of weapons and weapons systems including the FGM-148 Javelin, deFNder Medium, PROTECTOR RWS, IMPACT and Brimstone anti-tank system.

==== Multiscope ====
The Multiscope is the civilian version of the THeMIS UGV.

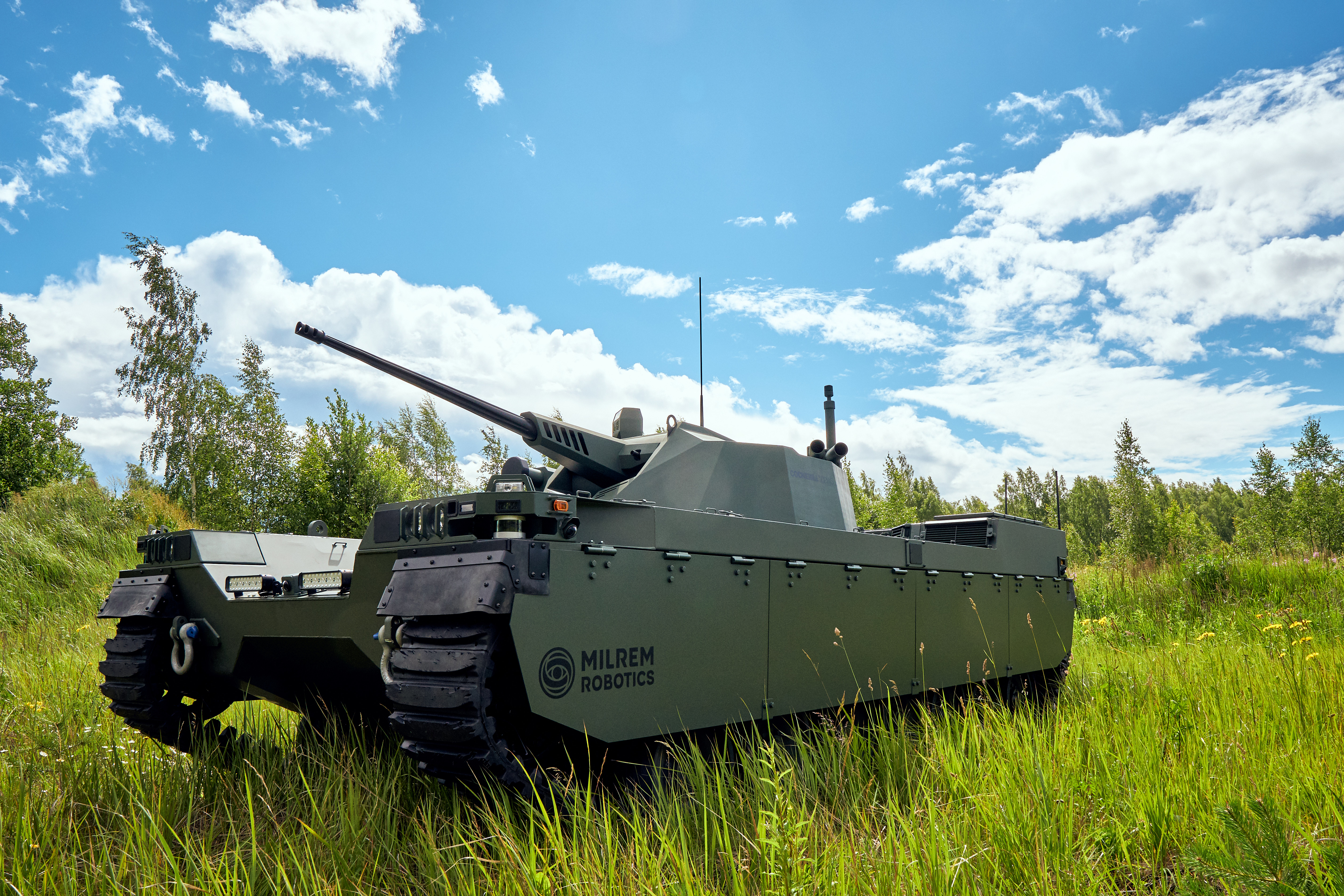
Type-X robotic combat vehicle

=== Type-X ===
The Type-X is an in-development 12-tonne class UGV.
