= Type-X (unmanned ground vehicle) =

Robotic combat vehicle designed by Milrem Robotics in Estonia

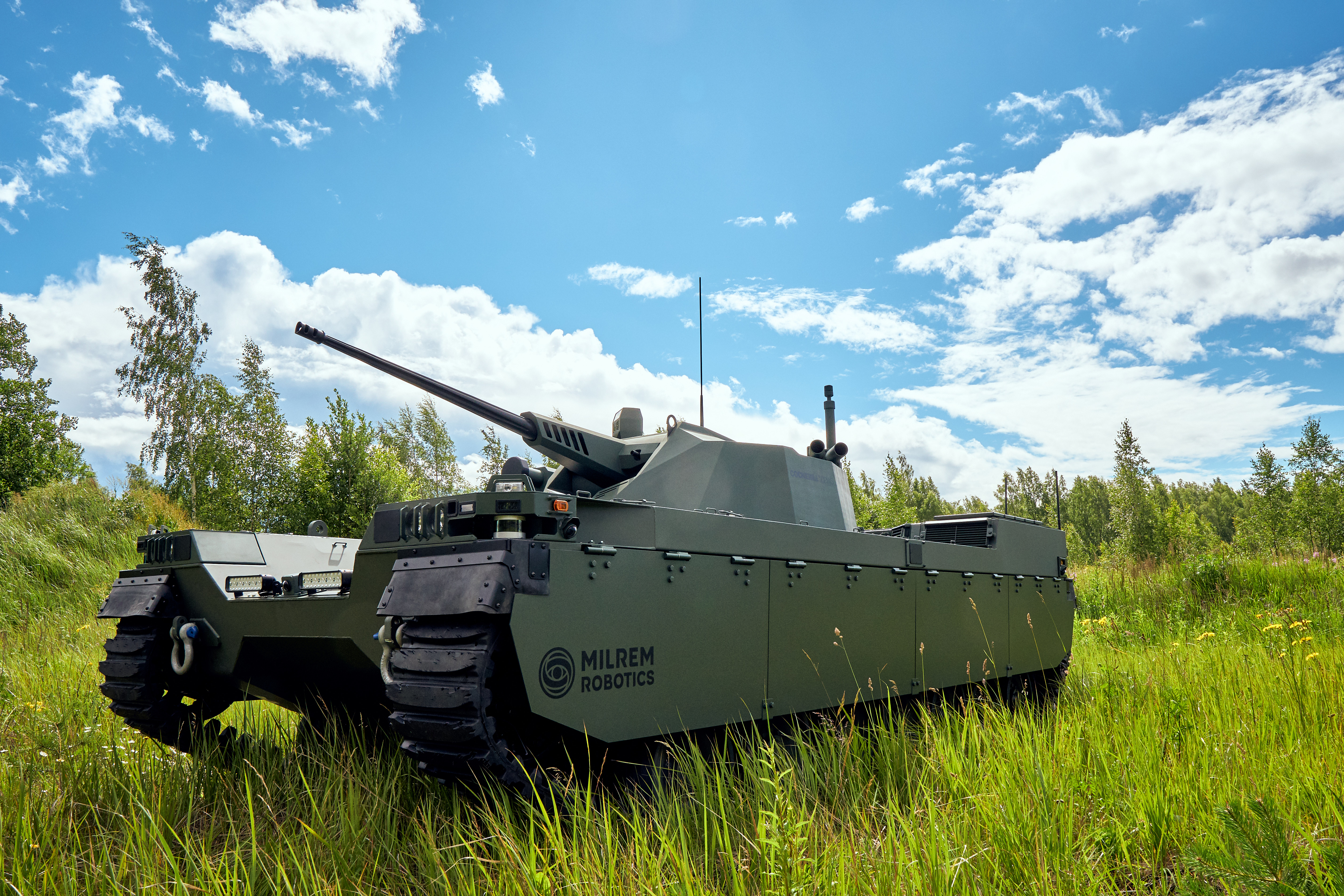
- Type-X Combat mounted with John Cockerill CPWS II turret
- Type: Unmanned ground vehicle Military robot
- Place of origin: Estonia

Production history
- Designer: Milrem Robotics
- Manufacturer: Milrem Robotics
- Produced: 2020-present
- Variants: Combat

Specifications
- Mass: 12,000 kg (26,000 lb)
- Length: 600 cm (240 in)
- Width: 290 cm (110 in)
- Height: 220 cm (87 in)
- Armor: STANAG 4569: Level 4 (Kinetic energy and artillery); Level 1 (Mine blast)
- Main armament: up to 50mm autocannon or other various weapons systems
- Secondary armament: 7.62mm machine gun
- Engine: Electric engine, diesel generator
- Payload capacity: 4,100 kg (9,000 lb)
- Drive: Tracked
- Ground clearance: 50 cm (20 in)
- Maximum speed: 80 km/h (50 mph) (road); 50 km/h (31 mph) (terrain)

The Type-X is a robotic combat vehicle designed and built by Milrem Robotics. Unveiled in 2020, it is the second UGV to be manufactured by the company after its flagship product THeMIS.

== Design and purpose ==
The vehicle is operated from a safe distance by a combination of augmented artificial intelligence (AI) and a remote system operator which means it considerably raises troop survivability and lowers lethality risks by increasing standoff distance from enemy units. It features a tracked design with armor protection which increases its cross-country performance and durability.

The Type-X is designed to be highly modifiable and easily upgradable, meaning it can be fitted with either autocannon turrets up to 50mm, such as John Cockerill CPWS II or various other weapons systems, such as ATGMs, SAMs, radars, mortars etc. The heavy armament that can be mounted on the vehicle means that the Type-X provides equal or overmatching firepower and tactical usage compared to traditional infantry fighting vehicles.

In October 2020, Milrem and the Israeli company UVision announced that they are co-developing a variant of the Type-X and THeMIS that can mount a multi-canister launcher for the latter's Hero-120 and Hero-400EC loitering munitions.

The intended main purpose of the Type-X is to bolster and support the combat capability of mechanized units, for example providing convoy and perimeter or base defence. It can drive along in a convoy autonomously using the "follow-me" technology, giving the formation additional eyes and firepower. The system can also be utilized to localize and engage lower range targets and provide flanking support.

The Type-X is designed to deploy at a weight below the 12-ton mark for rapid deployment into the combat theater, either by parachute or by heavy lift helicopter, providing vital fire support to airborne troops while maintaining a logistic footprint compatible with the logistics of a parachute-deployed force. The C-130J and the KC-390 can carry one Type-X vehicle, an A400M two and a C-17 5-6 vehicles.

== See also ==
- Milrem Robotics
- THeMIS
