= THeMIS =

Unmanned ground vehicle designed by Milerem Robotics in Estonia

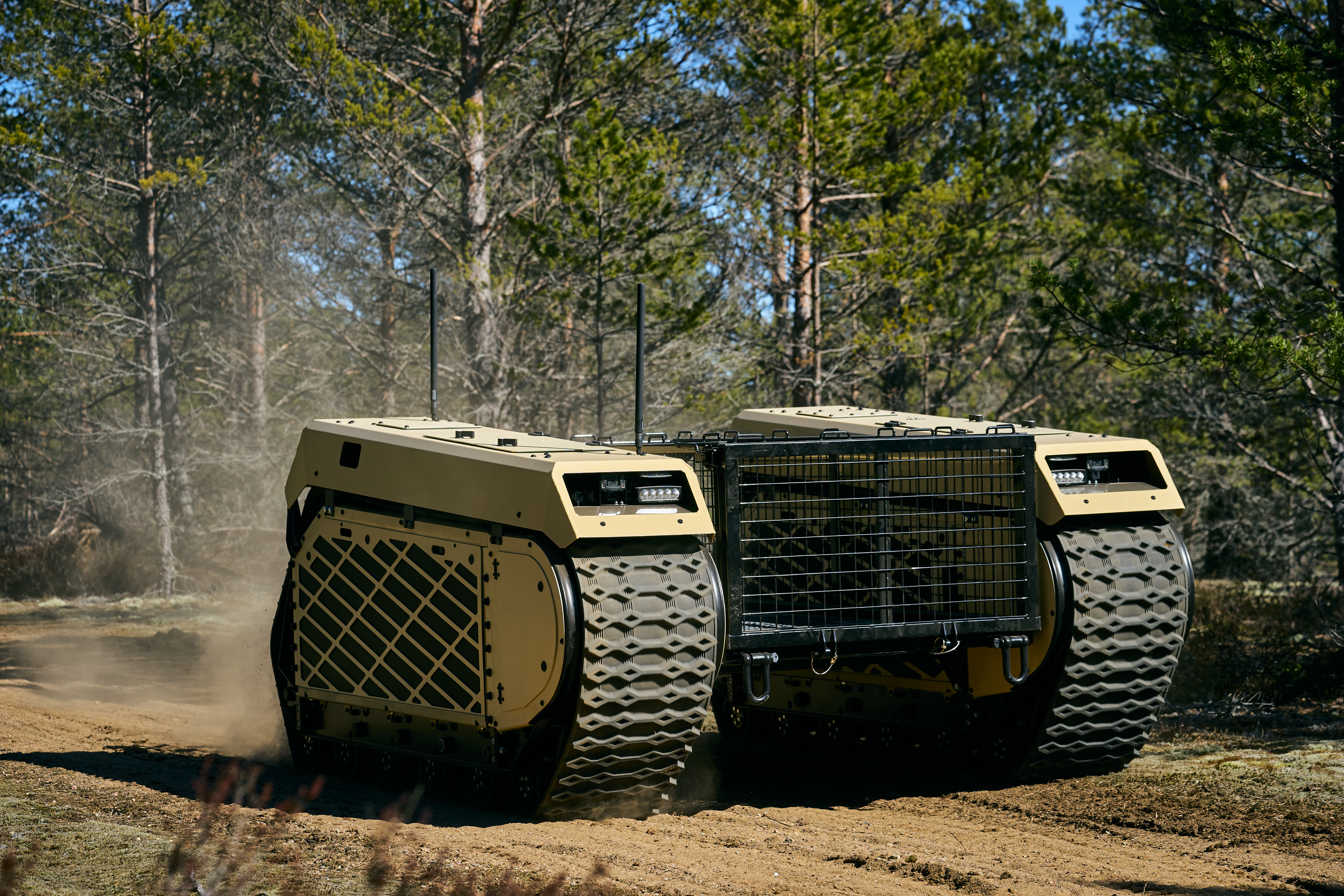
- A logistics variant of the THeMIS
- Type: Unmanned ground vehicle
- Place of origin: Estonia

Service history
- In service: 2019–present
- Used by: Estonian Defence Forces; Royal Netherlands Army
- Wars: Operation Barkhane; Russian invasion of Ukraine; 2025 Cambodia-Thailand conflict

Production history
- Designer: Milrem Robotics
- Manufacturer: Milrem Robotics
- Produced: 2015–present
- Variants: Logistics, Combat, ISR, EOD

Specifications
- Mass: 1,630 kg (3,590 lb)
- Length: 240 cm (94 in)
- Width: 200 cm (79 in)
- Height: 115 cm (45 in)
- Main armament: LMG, HMG, 40 mm AGL, 30 mm autocannon, ATGM, loitering munition launcher (Combat variant)
- Engine: Electric engine, diesel generator
- Payload capacity: 1,200 kg (2,600 lb)
- Drive: Tracked
- Ground clearance: 60 cm (24 in)
- Operational range: 1.5 km (0.93 mi)
- Maximum speed: 20 km/h (12 mph)

THeMIS (Tracked Hybrid Modular Infantry System), unmanned ground vehicle (UGV), is a ground-based armed drone vehicle designed largely for military applications, and is built by Milrem Robotics in Estonia. The vehicle is intended to provide support for dismounted troops by serving as a transport platform, remote weapon station, IED detection and disposal unit etc.

== Capability ==
The vehicle's open architecture gives it multi-missions capability. The main purpose of the THeMIS Transport is to support onbase logistics and provide last mile resupply for fighting units on the frontline. It supports infantry units by reducing their physical and cognitive load, increasing standoff distance, force protection and survivability. THeMIS Combat UGVs provide direct fire support for manoeuvre forces acting as a force multiplier.

With an integrated self-stabilizing remote-controlled weapon system, they provide high precision over wide areas, day and night, increasing standoff distance, force protection and survivability. Combat UGVs can be equipped with light or heavy machine guns, 40 mm grenade launchers, 30 mm autocannons and Anti-Tank Missile Systems.

THeMIS ISR UGVs have advanced multi-sensor intelligence gathering capabilities. Their main purpose is to increase situational awareness, provide improved intelligence, surveillance and reconnaissance over wide areas and battle damage assessment capability. The system can effectively enhance the work of dismounted infantry units, border guard and law enforcement agencies to collect and process raw information and decrease the reaction time for commanders. THeMIS is capable of firing conventional machine gun ammunition or missile rounds.

== History ==
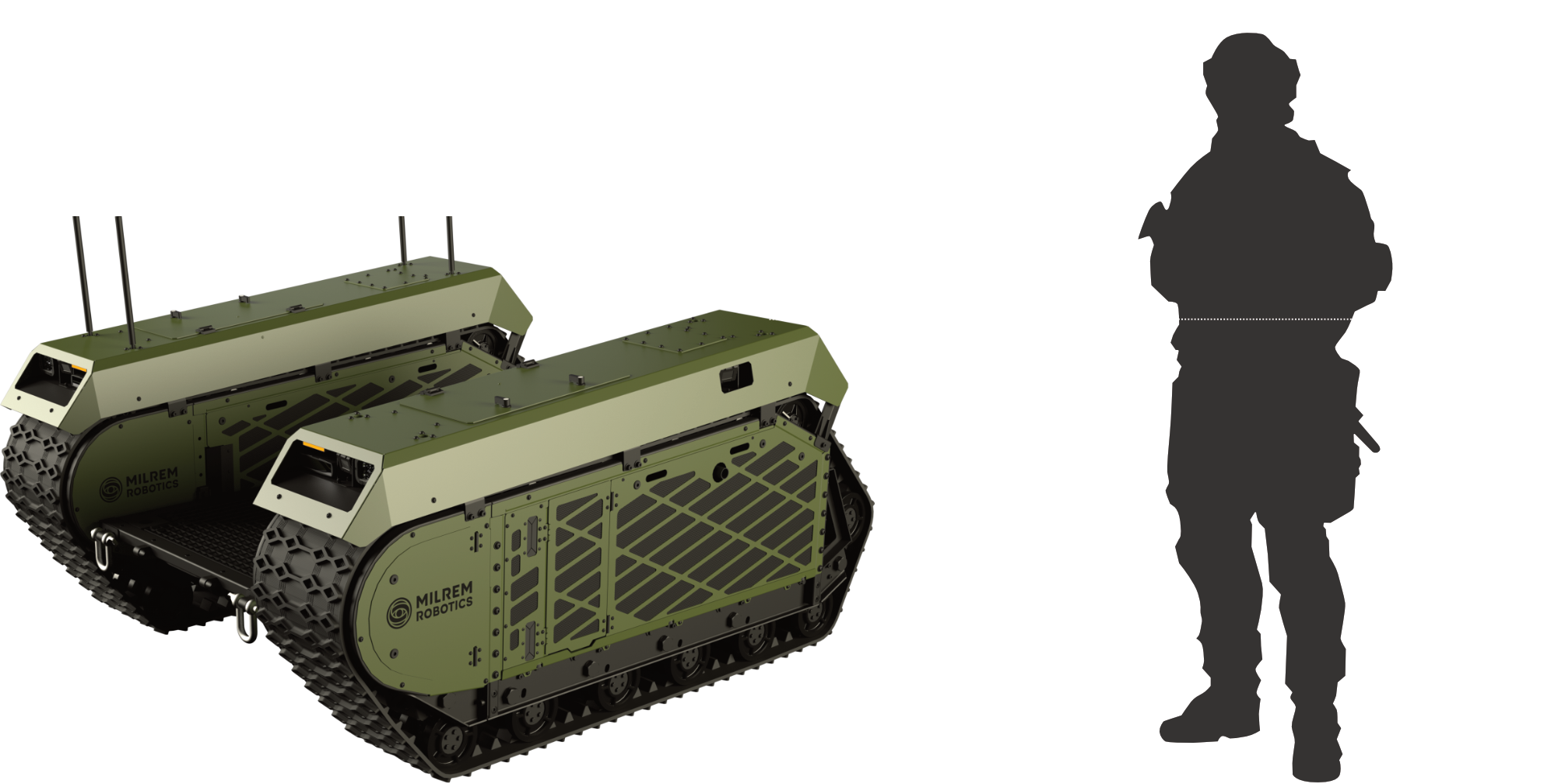
A Milrem Robotics UGV THeMIS size comparison

In September 2020, Estonia and the Netherlands announced that they are jointly acquiring 7 THeMIS UGVs. Both nations' armies have previously tested the system extensively.

In September 2022, Milrem Robotics delivered the THeMIS UGVs suited for casualty evacuation (CASEVAC) and transportation of supplies to Ukraine. In November 2022, the German Ministry of Defense through Krauss-Maffei Wegmann (KMW) signed a contract to deliver another 14 THeMIS unmanned ground vehicles (UGV) to Ukraine.

The system has been exported to several NATO members and allies, including Australia, France, Germany, the Netherlands, Norway, the United Kingdom, Ukraine, and the United States.

== Operators ==
A map with THeMIS users in blue

Denmark

- Danish Defence

Estonia

- Estonian Defence Forces

India

- Indian Armed Forces

Netherlands

- Royal Netherlands Army

Spain

- Spanish Armed Forces, first unit received in August 2022.

Sweden

- Swedish Armed Forces

Thailand

- Royal Thai Army

Ukraine

- Armed Forces of Ukraine

== See also ==
- Type-X, Milrem's 12-tonne robotic combat vehicle
- Iran Aria combat robot
