= Metigo =

Software application

metigo
- Developer(s): fokus GmbH Leipzig
- Initial release: 2000; 25 years ago
- Stable release: 4.0, 64-bit, multi-core supported / 2013; 12 years ago
- Operating system: Windows
- Type: Photogrammetry
- License: Proprietary commercial software
- Website: http://fokus-gmbh-leipzig.de/metigo_map-40_1.php?lang=en

metigo is a software application that performs image-based modelling and close range photogrammetry. It produces rectified imagery plans, true ortho-projections on planar, cylindric and conic surfaces, 3D photorealistic models, measurements from photography and mappings on a photographic base for uses in the cultural heritage sector, mainly conservation.

== Products ==
The metigo product line currently consists of

- the mapping software metigo MAP,
- the stereo-photogrammetry modeling software metigo 3D,
- the free viewer metigo VIEW.

These products are all standalone and are not depending on other software, such as AutoCAD.

=== metigo MAP ===
metigo MAP is mainly used to map findings and conservation measured on a uniform metric photographic base. Therefore, photos of planar surfaces can be rectified based on geometrical informations, e.g. height and width of a rectangle, or cartesian coordinates measured by total station.

Beside rectified imagery several other metric mapping bases can be imported and used:

- true ortho-projections;
- scaled scans of plans and plots;
- CAD-files;
- 3D models, such as digital surface models (DSM) produced by stereo-photogrammetry, SfM or 3D scanning.

metigo MAP 's strong point is that rectified imagery taken with different techniques (visual light, sided light, IR, UV, UV-fluorescence, X-ray), historic images and photos taken at various stages of the conservation process can be superimposed and evaluated mutually.

The user can allocate several attributes, such as different conservation measures and damage classes, to the mapped geometries. The mappings can be analysed by geometries as well as by user-defined attributes at any stage of the project.

metigo MAP targets mainly conservators in different cultural heritage fields. Using it no specialist knowledge of surveying and photogrammetric techniques are needed.

=== metigo 3D ===
metigo 3D is a stereo-photogrammetric kit that allows to

- calculate bundle adjustments (axios3D),
- create high-quality 3D point clouds using multiple stereo photo pairs combined with metric survey data,
- mesh these point clouds,
- texture the meshes with high-resolution image data to create photo-realistic models,
- ortho-project orientated images on digital surface models (DSM) on planes and best-fit cylinders and cones,
- create unwrappings and developed views of curved surfaces,
- analyse deformations of 3D surfaces.

metigo 3D targets metric survey specialists working in the cultural heritage sector.

== Supported file formats ==
metigo has the ability to read the following formats:

- images: JPEG (.jpg), Tiff (.tif), Bitmaps (.bmp), CompuServ (.gif), Encapsualated Postscript (.eps), PCX (.pcx), Photo-CD (.pcd), PICT (.pcd), PNG (.png), Targa (.tga), RAW-format of several camera brands.
- CAD: DBX, DXF, DWG.
- 3D: many ASCII-formats (.stl, *.wrl, etc.)
- point data: format editor for ASCII files.

== Supported languages ==
Currently, an English and German version of the software is supported. For metigo MAP beside these a French and Polish GUI is offered for sale.

== Applications ==
The main applications of metigo are:

- conservation in the cultural heritage context, e.g.
  - stone conservation
  - paintings
  - tapestry
  - etc.
- architecture,
- archaeology,
- many other are possible, e.g. forensics.

== History ==
The first public release of metigo was in 2000.

== See also ==
- Image rectification
- Stereophotogrammetry
- 3D data acquisition and object reconstruction
- Image-based modeling and rendering
