= Image rectification =

Transformation process to project images

A camera (red) rotates about the blue axis by 5° to 90° (green), as the images are rectified by projection to the virtual image plane (blue). The virtual plane must be parallel to the stereo baseline (orange) and for visualization is located in the center of rotation. In this case, rectification is achieved by a virtual rotation of the red and green image planes, respectively, to be parallel to the stereo baseline.

Image rectification is a transformation process used to project images onto a common image plane. This process has several degrees of freedom and there are many strategies for transforming images to the common plane. Image rectification is used in computer stereo vision to simplify the problem of finding matching points between images (i.e. the correspondence problem), and in geographic information systems (GIS) to merge images taken from multiple perspectives into a common map coordinate system.

== In computer vision ==
The search for point $\mathbf{x}_L$'s match is restricted to the line $\overline{\mathbf{e}_R \mathbf{x}_R}$in the right image. Since the images are not rectified, the line $\overline{\mathbf{e}_R \mathbf{x}_R}$ is slanted. After rectification it would be horizontal.

Computer stereo vision takes two or more images with known relative camera positions that show an object from different viewpoints. For each pixel it then determines the corresponding scene point's depth (i.e. distance from the camera) by first finding matching pixels (i.e. pixels showing the same scene point) in the other image(s) and then applying triangulation to the found matches to determine their depth. Finding matches in stereo vision is restricted by epipolar geometry: Each pixel's match in another image can only be found on a line called the epipolar line. If two images are coplanar, i.e. they were taken such that the right camera is only offset horizontally compared to the left camera (not being moved towards the object or rotated), then each pixel's epipolar line is horizontal and at the same vertical position as that pixel. However, in general settings (the camera does move towards the object or rotate) the epipolar lines are slanted. Image rectification warps both images such that they appear as if they have been taken with only a horizontal displacement and as a consequence all epipolar lines are horizontal, which slightly simplifies the stereo matching process. Note however, that rectification does not fundamentally change the stereo matching process: It searches on lines, slanted ones before and horizontal ones after rectification.

Image rectification is also an equivalent (and more often used) alternative to perfect camera coplanarity. Even with high-precision equipment, image rectification is usually performed because it may be impractical to maintain perfect coplanarity between cameras.

Image rectification can only be performed with two images at a time and simultaneous rectification of more than two images is generally impossible.

=== Transformation ===
If the images to be rectified are taken from camera pairs without geometric distortion, this calculation can easily be made with a linear transformation. X & Y rotation puts the images on the same plane, scaling makes the image frames be the same size and Z rotation & skew adjustments make the image pixel rows directly line up. The rigid alignment of the cameras needs to be known (by calibration) and the calibration coefficients are used by the transform.

In performing the transform, if the cameras themselves are calibrated for internal parameters, an essential matrix provides the relationship between the cameras. The more general case (without camera calibration) is represented by the fundamental matrix. If the fundamental matrix is not known, it is necessary to find preliminary point correspondences between stereo images to facilitate its extraction.

=== Algorithms ===
There are three main categories for image rectification algorithms: planar rectification, cylindrical rectification and polar rectification.

=== Implementation details ===
All rectified images satisfy the following two properties:

- All epipolar lines are parallel to the horizontal axis.
- Corresponding points have identical vertical coordinates.

In order to transform the original image pair into a rectified image pair, it is necessary to find a projective transformation H. Constraints are placed on H to satisfy the two properties above. For example, constraining the epipolar lines to be parallel with the horizontal axis means that epipoles must be mapped to the infinite point [1,0,0]^{T} in homogeneous coordinates. Even with these constraints, H still has four degrees of freedom. It is also necessary to find a matching H' to rectify the second image of an image pair. Poor choices of H and H' can result in rectified images that are dramatically changed in scale or severely distorted.

There are many different strategies for choosing a projective transform H for each image from all possible solutions. One advanced method is minimizing the disparity or least-square difference of corresponding points on the horizontal axis of the rectified image pair. Another method is separating H into a specialized projective transform, similarity transform, and shearing transform to minimize image distortion. One simple method is to rotate both images to look perpendicular to the line joining their collective optical centers, twist the optical axes so the horizontal axis of each image points in the direction of the other image's optical center, and finally scale the smaller image to match for line-to-line correspondence. This process is demonstrated in the following example.

=== Example ===
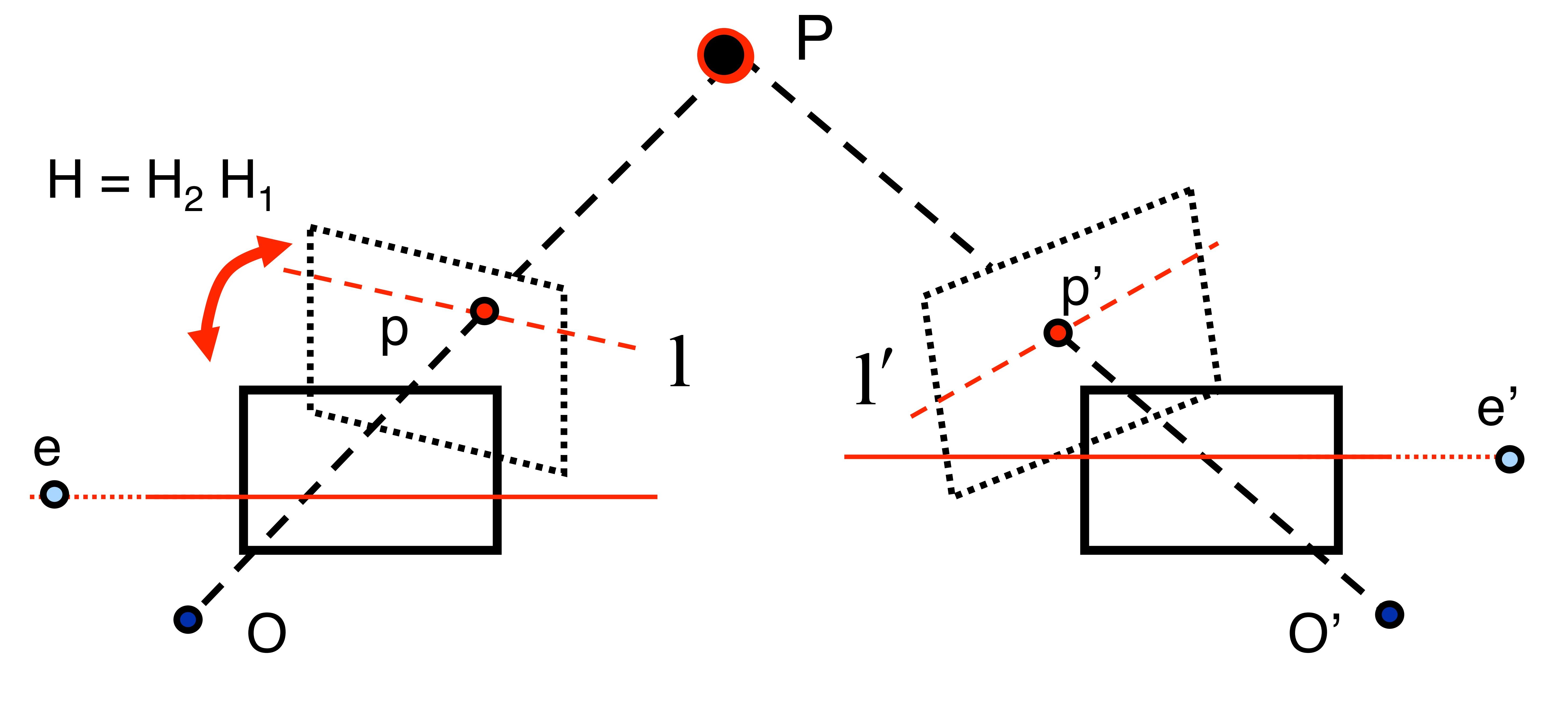
Model used for image rectification example

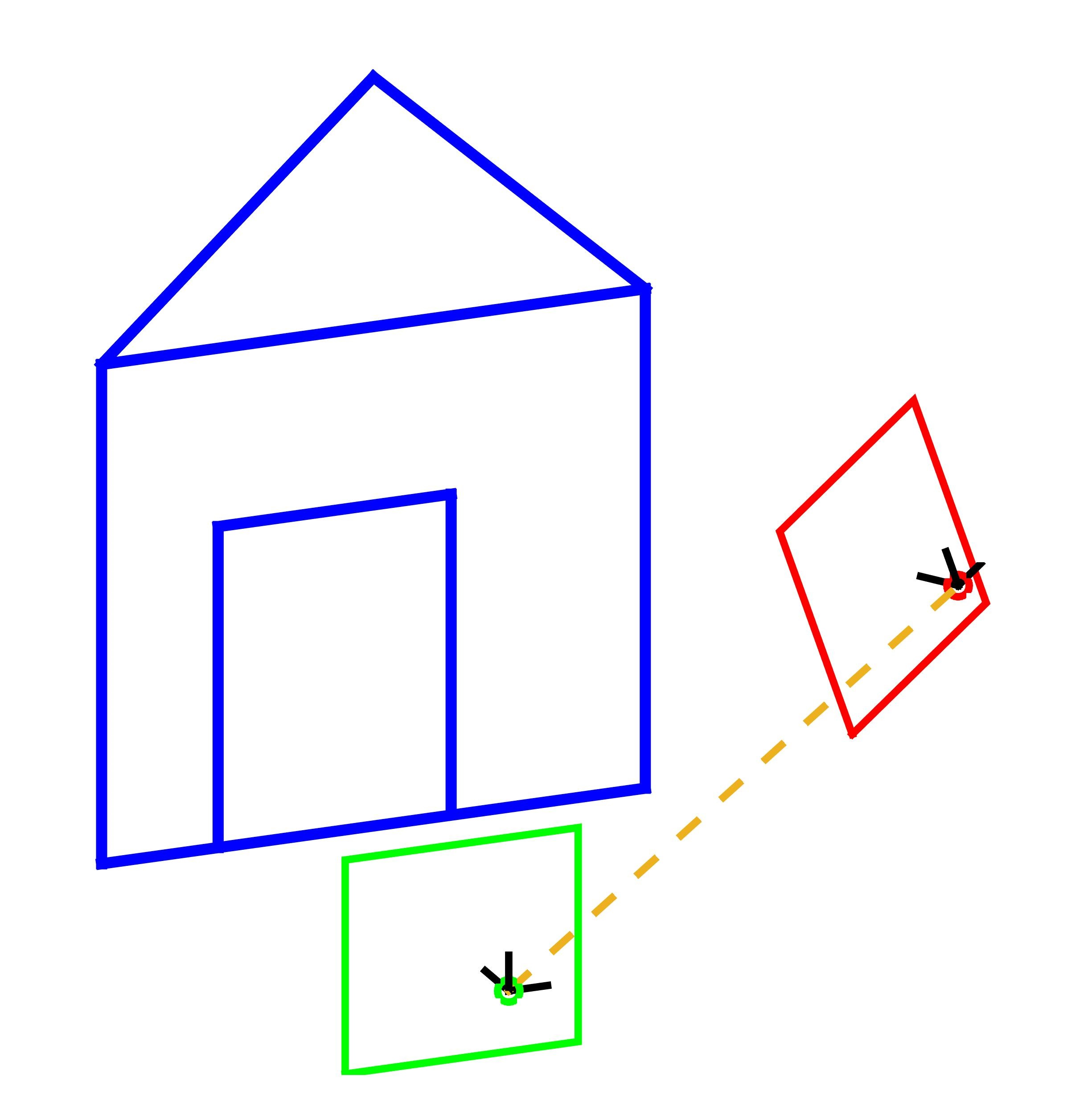
3D view of example scene. The first camera's optical center and image plane are represented by the green circle and square respectively. The second camera has similar red representations.

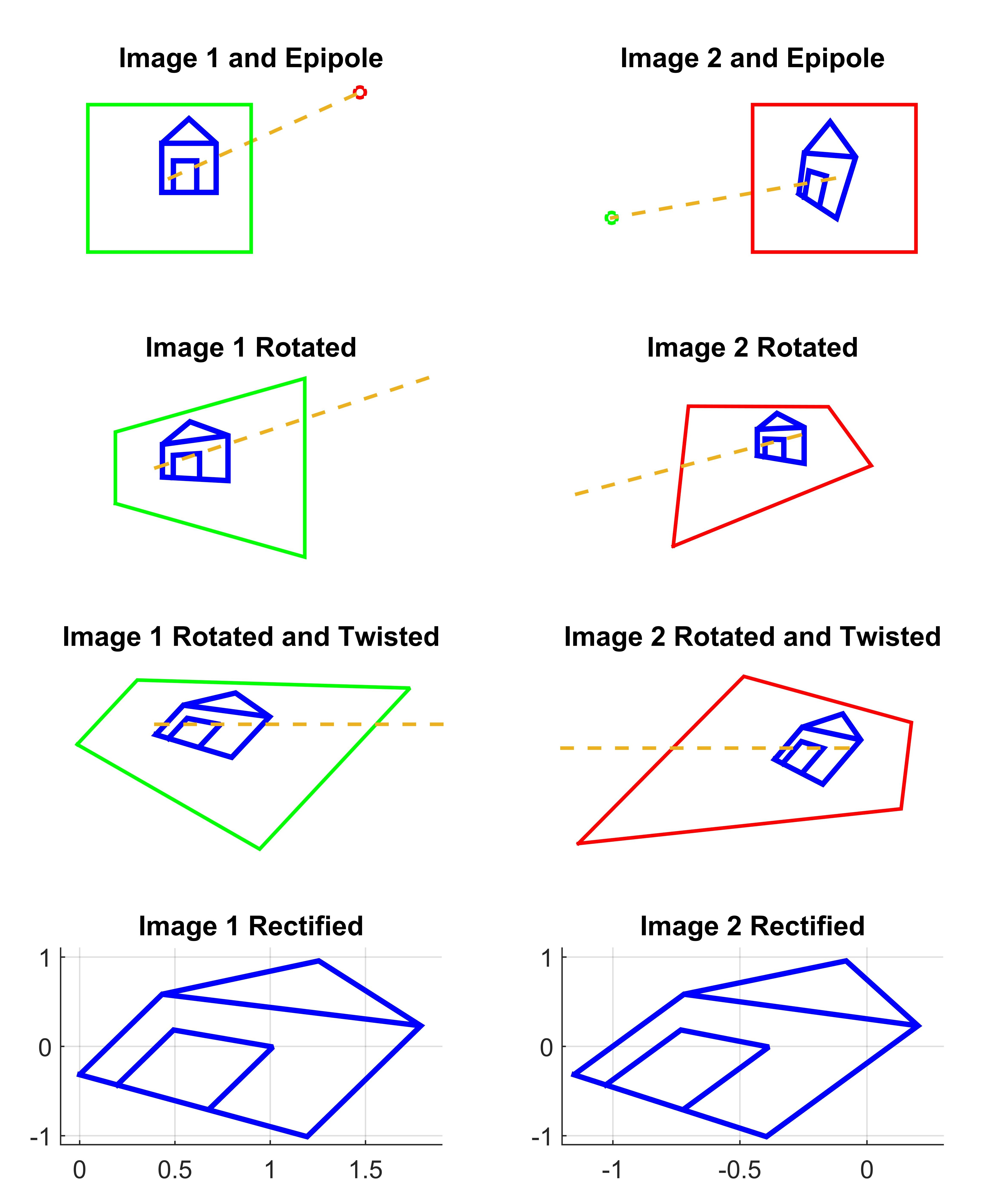
Set of 2D images from example. The original images are taken from different perspectives (row 1). Using systematic transformations from the example (rows 2 and 3), we are able to transform both images such that corresponding points are on the same horizontal scan lines (row 4).

Our model for this example is based on a pair of images that observe a 3D point P, which corresponds to p and p' in the pixel coordinates of each image. O and O' represent the optical centers of each camera, with known camera matrices $M=K[I~ 0]$ and $M'=K'[R~ T]$ (we assume the world origin is at the first camera). We will briefly outline and depict the results for a simple approach to find a H and H' projective transformation that rectify the image pair from the example scene.

First, we compute the epipoles, e and e' in each image:

$$e=M \begin{bmatrix} O' \\ 1 \end{bmatrix}
=M\begin{bmatrix} -R^T T \\ 1 \end{bmatrix} = K[I~ 0]\begin{bmatrix} -R^T T \\ 1 \end{bmatrix} = -KR^T T$$
$$e'=M'\begin{bmatrix} O \\ 1 \end{bmatrix} = M'\begin{bmatrix} 0 \\ 1 \end{bmatrix} = K'[R~T]\begin{bmatrix} 0 \\ 1 \end{bmatrix} = K'T$$

Second, we find a projective transformation H_{1} that rotates our first image to be parallel to the baseline connecting O and O' (row 2, column 1 of 2D image set). This rotation can be found by using the cross product between the original and the desired optical axes. Next, we find the projective transformation H_{2} that takes the rotated image and twists it so that the horizontal axis aligns with the baseline. If calculated correctly, this second transformation should map the e to infinity on the x axis (row 3, column 1 of 2D image set). Finally, define $H=H_2H_1$ as the projective transformation for rectifying the first image.

Third, through an equivalent operation, we can find H' to rectify the second image (column 2 of 2D image set). Note that H'_{1} should rotate the second image's optical axis to be parallel with the transformed optical axis of the first image. One strategy is to pick a plane parallel to the line where the two original optical axes intersect to minimize distortion from the reprojection process. In this example, we simply define H' using the rotation matrix R and initial projective transformation H as $H' = HR^T$.

Finally, we scale both images to the same approximate resolution and align the now horizontal epipoles for easier horizontal scanning for correspondences (row 4 of 2D image set).

Note that it is possible to perform this and similar algorithms without having the camera parameter matrices M and M' . All that is required is a set of seven or more image to image correspondences to compute the fundamental matrices and epipoles.

== In geographic information system ==
Image rectification in GIS converts images to a standard map coordinate system. This is done by matching ground control points (GCP) in the mapping system to points in the image. These GCPs calculate necessary image transforms.

Primary difficulties in the process occur

- when the accuracy of the map points are not well known
- when the images lack clearly identifiable points to correspond to the maps.

The maps that are used with rectified images are non-topographical. However, the images to be used may contain distortion from terrain. Image orthorectification additionally removes these effects.

Image rectification is a standard feature available with GIS software packages.

== See also ==
- Binocular disparity
- Correspondence problem
- Epipolar geometry
- Geographic information system
- Georeferencing
- Homography
- Image registration
- Photogrammetry
- Point set registration
- Rubbersheeting
- Software correction of lens distortion
- Stereo camera
- Stereo vision
- Structure from motion
