= Visual hull =

Geometric entity created by a 3D reconstruction technique

Two silhouette cones produced from two silhouette images taken from different viewpoints.

Visual hull resulting from the intersection of two silhouette cones.

A visual hull is a geometric entity created by shape-from-silhouette 3D reconstruction technique introduced by A. Laurentini.

This technique assumes the foreground object in an image can be separated from the background. Under this assumption, the original image can be thresholded into a foreground/background binary image, which we call a silhouette image. The foreground mask, known as a silhouette, is the 2D projection of the corresponding 3D foreground object. Along with the camera viewing parameters, the silhouette defines a back-projected generalized cone that contains the actual object; this cone is called a silhouette cone, the surface of a cone of rays. The intersection of the two silhouette cones defines a visual hull. which is a bounding geometry of the actual 3D object. When the reconstructed geometry is only used for rendering from a different viewpoint, the implicit reconstruction together with rendering can be done using graphics hardware.

== In two dimensions ==
A technique used in some modern touchscreen devices employs cameras placed in the corners situated opposite infrared LEDs. The one-dimensional projection (shadow) of objects on the surface may be used to reconstruct the convex hull of the object.

Visual hull generation method has also been used within experimental tele-meeting systems that aim to allow a user in a remote location to interact with virtual objects. The method uses multiple cameras to capture the real-world movements and interactions of the "sender", employing hardware-accelerated volumetric visual hull representation to create 3D volume from 2D multi-view images. Its ultimate aim is to allow 3D collaboration between the two users in the virtual realm, with the visual hull technique reducing the computational power required to allow this type of interaction and enabling the use of consumer goods such as the Wii Remote as a tool for interaction.

== See also ==
- 3D reconstruction from multiple images
- Tomographic reconstruction
