= Fundamental matrix (computer vision) =

Matrix in computer version

In computer vision, the fundamental matrix $\mathbf{F}$ is a 3×3 matrix which relates corresponding points in stereo images. In epipolar geometry, with homogeneous image coordinates, x and x′, of corresponding points in a stereo image pair, Fx describes a line (an epipolar line) on which the corresponding point x′ on the other image must lie. That means, for all pairs of corresponding points holds

$$\mathbf{x}'^{\top}  \mathbf{F x} = 0.$$

Being of rank two and determined only up to scale, the fundamental matrix can be estimated given at least seven point correspondences. Its seven parameters represent the only geometric information about cameras that can be obtained through point correspondences alone.

The term "fundamental matrix" was coined by QT Luong in his influential PhD thesis. It is sometimes also referred to as the "bifocal tensor". As a tensor it is a two-point tensor in that it is a bilinear form relating points in distinct coordinate systems.

The above relation which defines the fundamental matrix was published in 1992 by both Olivier Faugeras and Richard Hartley. Although H. Christopher Longuet-Higgins' essential matrix satisfies a similar relationship, the essential matrix is a metric object pertaining to calibrated cameras, while the fundamental matrix describes the correspondence in more general and fundamental terms of projective geometry. This is captured mathematically by the relationship between a fundamental matrix $\mathbf{F}$ and its corresponding essential matrix $\mathbf{E}$, which is

$$\mathbf{E} = ({\mathbf{K}'})^{\top} \; \mathbf{F} \; \mathbf{K}$$

$\mathbf{K}$ and $\mathbf{K}'$ being the intrinsic calibration matrices of the two images involved.

== Introduction ==
The fundamental matrix is a relationship between any two images of the same scene that constrains where the projection of points from the scene can occur in both images. Given the projection of a scene point into one of the images the corresponding point in the other image is constrained to a line, helping the search, and allowing for the detection of wrong correspondences. The relation between corresponding points, which the fundamental matrix represents, is referred to as epipolar constraint, matching constraint, discrete matching constraint, or incidence relation.

== Projective reconstruction theorem ==
The fundamental matrix can be determined by a set of point correspondences. Additionally, these corresponding image points may be triangulated to world points with the help of camera matrices derived directly from this fundamental matrix. The scene composed of these world points is within a projective transformation of the true scene.

=== Proof ===
Say that the image point correspondence $\mathbf{x} \leftrightarrow \mathbf{x'}$ derives from the world point $\textbf{X}$ under the camera matrices $\left ( \textbf{P}, \textbf{P}' \right )$ as

$$\begin{align}
\mathbf{x} & = \textbf{P} \textbf{X} \\
\mathbf{x'} & = \textbf{P}' \textbf{X}
\end{align}$$

Say we transform space by a general homography matrix $\textbf{H}_{4 \times 4}$ such that $\textbf{X}_0 = \textbf{H} \textbf{X}$.

The cameras then transform as

$$\begin{align}
\textbf{P}_0 & = \textbf{P} \textbf{H}^{-1} \\
\textbf{P}_0' & = \textbf{P}' \textbf{H}^{-1}
\end{align}$$

$\textbf{P}_0 \textbf{X}_0 = \textbf{P} \textbf{H}^{-1} \textbf{H} \textbf{X} = \textbf{P} \textbf{X} = \mathbf{x}$ and likewise with $\textbf{P}_0'$ still get us the same image points.

== Derivation of the fundamental matrix using coplanarity condition ==
The fundamental matrix can also be derived using the coplanarity condition.

== For satellite images ==
The fundamental matrix expresses the epipolar geometry in stereo images. The epipolar geometry in images taken with perspective cameras appears as straight lines. However, in satellite images, the image is formed during the sensor movement along its orbit (pushbroom sensor). Therefore, there are multiple projection centers for one image scene and the epipolar line is formed as an epipolar curve. However, in special conditions such as small image tiles, the satellite images could be rectified using the fundamental matrix.

== Properties ==
The fundamental matrix is of rank 2. Its kernel defines the epipole.

== See also ==
- Epipolar geometry
- Essential matrix
- Trifocal tensor
- Eight-point algorithm

== Toolboxes ==
- fundest is a GPL C/C++ library for robust, non-linear (based on the Levenberg–Marquardt algorithm) fundamental matrix estimation from matched point pairs and various objective functions (Manolis Lourakis).
- Structure and Motion Toolkit in MATLAB (Philip H. S. Torr)
- Fundamental Matrix Estimation Toolbox (Joaquim Salvi)
- The Epipolar Geometry Toolbox (EGT)
