= Richard Hartley (scientist) =

Australian computer scientist

- Education: Australian National University; Stanford University; University of Toronto (1976, PhD)
- Known for: Computer Vision, Multiple-view geometry

Richard I. Hartley FAA is an Australian computer scientist and an Emeritus professor at the Australian National University, where he is a member of the Computer Vision group in the Research School of Computing.

== Education and career ==
In 1971, Hartley received a BSc degree from the Australian National University followed by MSc (1972) and PhD (1976) degrees in mathematics from the University of Toronto. He also obtained an MSc degree in computer science from Stanford University in 1983.

His work is primarily devoted to the fields of Artificial intelligence, Image processing, and Computer vision. He is best known for his 2000 book Multiple View Geometry in computer vision, written with Andrew Zisserman, now in its second edition (2004). According to WorldCat, the book is held in 1428 libraries.

Hartley was elected a Fellow of the Australian Academy of Science in 2005 and awarded their Hannan Medal in 2023. He was elected a Fellow of the Royal Society in 2024.

== Publications ==
Hartley has published a wide variety of articles in computer science on the topics of computer vision and optimization. The following are his most highly cited works

- 2000 Multiple View Geometry in Computer Vision with Andrew Zisserman, Cambridge University press. Second edition 2004.
- 2000 "Bundle adjustment—a modern synthesis" with Bill Triggs, Philip F McLauchlan, and Andrew W Fitzgibbon in Vision algorithms: theory and practice, pp. 298–372.
- 1997 "In defense of the eight-point algorithm" IEEE Transactions on PAMI 19 (6), 580–593.
