= Homography (disambiguation) =

A homography may refer to

- homography, a type of isomorphism of projective spaces,
- homography (computer vision), a mapping relating perspective images of the same scene,
- homograph, a word written the same but with different meaning, or
- heterography and homography, a measure of phonetic consistency in language.
