= Chaumette =

Chaumette is a French surname. Notable people with the surname include:

- François Chaumette (1923–1996), French actor
- François Chaumette, French engineer
- Monique Chaumette (born 1927), French actress
- Pierre Gaspard Chaumette (1763–1794), French politician
