= Intrinsic localization =

Intrinsic localization is a method used in mobile laser scanning to recover the trajectory of the scanner, after, or during the measurement. Specifically, it is a way to recover the spatial coordinates and the rotation of the scanner without the use of any other sensors, i.e., extrinsic information. To function in practice, intrinsic localization relies on two things. First, a priori knowledge of the scanning instruments, and second, on sensor data overlap employing simultaneous localization and mapping (SLAM) methods. The term was coined in.

== Examples ==
Two-dimensional (2D) SLAM is a basic example of intrinsic localization. In three dimensions (3D) with six degrees of freedom, full reconstructions of the environment are feasible

== Other ways ==
Other, i.e. extrinsic, ways of localizing mobile laser scanners include using global navigation satellite system (GNSS), inertial measurement unit (IMU), knowledge of the scanner inclination angle, or odometry.
