= Principal point =

Principal point may refer to:

- Principal point (optics), in optics
- Pinhole camera principal point, in the analysis of pinhole cameras
- Principal Point, the southeast end of Wiencke Island
