= Rational polynomial coefficient =

Rational Polynomial Coefficients (RPCs) provide a compact representation of a ground-to-image geometry, allowing photogrammetric processing without requiring a physical camera model, such as the pinhole camera model.

"The RPC model forms the co-ordinates of the image point as ratios of the cubic polynomials in the co-ordinates of the world or object space or ground point. A set of images is given to determine the set of polynomial coefficients in the RPC model to minimise the error".

== See also ==
- Camera resectioning
- Orthorectification
