= Computational visualistics =

Study of how computers can be used to generate images

Computational visualistics is an interdisciplinary field focused on the use of computers to generate and analyze images, upon which is usually directly implicated for the large language models that become discussed inside artificial intelligence research.

== Areas covered ==
In the study of images within computer science, the abstract data type "image" (or potentially several such types) is a central focus, along with its various implementations. Three main groups of algorithms are relevant to this data type in computational visualistics:

=== Algorithms from "image" to "image" ===
Algorithms from "image" to "image" involve image processing, which focuses on operations that convert one or more input images, possibly with additional non-image parameters, into an output image. These operations support various applications, including enhancing image quality through techniques like contrast enhancement, extracting features such as edge detection, and identifying and isolating patterns based on predefined criteria, such as the blue screen technique. The field also encompasses the development of compression algorithms, crucial for the efficient storage and transmission of image data.

=== Algorithms from "image" to "not-image" ===
Two disciplines focus on transforming images into non-pictorial data. The field of pattern recognition, although not limited to images, has made significant contributions to computational visualistics since the early 1950s. This work includes classifying information within images, such as identifying geometric shapes (e.g., circular regions), recognizing handwritten text, detecting spatial objects, and associating stylistic attributes. The goal is to map images to non-pictorial data types that describe various aspects of the images. In contrast, computer vision, a branch of artificial intelligence (AI), aims to enable computers to achieve visual perception akin to human vision. Problems in computer vision are considered semantic when their objectives closely align with human-like understanding of objects within images.

=== Algorithms from "not-image" to "image" ===
The exploration of how operations involving non-pictorial data types can generate images is particularly relevant in computer graphics and information visualization. Computer graphics focuses on creating images that represent spatial configurations of objects, often in a naturalistic manner, such as in virtual architecture. These image-generating algorithms typically start with data describing three-dimensional geometry and scene lighting, along with the optical properties of surfaces. In contrast, information visualization aims to depict various data types, especially those with non-visual components, using visual conventions such as color codes or icons. Fractal images, such as those of the Mandelbrot set, represent a borderline case in information visualization, where abstract mathematical properties are visualized.

== Computational visualistics degree programmes ==
The field of computational visualistics was established at the University of Magdeburg, Germany, in the fall of 1996. Initiated by Thomas Strothotte, a professor of computer graphics, and supported by Jörg Schirra and a team of interdisciplinary researchers from social, technical sciences, and medicine, the program focuses on the application of computer science to image-related problems. The five-year diploma program emphasizes core computer science courses, including digital methods and electronic tools, and integrates courses on the use of images in the humanities. Students also develop communicative skills and apply their knowledge in practical areas such as biology and medicine, particularly in fields involving digital image data like microscopy and radiology. Bachelor’s and Master’s programs were introduced in 2006. The University of Koblenz features a similar degree program.
