= François Chaumette (engineer) =

French electrical engineer

François Chaumette (born December 1963) is a French electrical engineer at the University of Rennes 1 (IRISA)e. Chaumette was named a Fellow of the Institute of Electrical and Electronics Engineers (IEEE) in 2013 for his contributions to vision-based robot control.

== Education and career ==
Chaumette was born in Nantes, France. After graduating from the Ecole Nationale Supérieure de Mécanique in 1987 in his hometown, Chaumette studied for his Ph.D. at University of Rennes 1 where he also got habilitation in computer science following graduation from the institution in 1990 and 1998 respectively. Since 2008, he serves on Editorial Board of the International Journal of Robotics Research and is a funding senior editor of the IEEE Robotics and Automation Letters. He also served on an Administrative Committee of the IEEE Robotics and Automation Society from 2016 to 2018 and in 2013, 2015, and 2017 served as panel member of the ERC PE7 Consolidator Grants.
