= Oriented FAST and rotated BRIEF =

Feature detection and description computer vision algorithm

Oriented FAST and rotated BRIEF (ORB) is a fast robust local feature detector, first presented by Ethan Rublee et al. in 2011, that can be used in computer vision tasks like object recognition or 3D reconstruction. It is based on the FAST keypoint detector and a modified version of the visual descriptor BRIEF (Binary Robust Independent Elementary Features). Its aim is to provide a fast and efficient alternative to SIFT.

== See also ==
- Scale-invariant feature transform (SIFT)
- Gradient Location and Orientation Histogram
- LESH - Local Energy based Shape Histogram
- Blob detection
- Feature detection (computer vision)
