= David G. Lowe =

Canadian computer scientist

- Citizenship: Canada
- Education: University of British Columbia; Stanford University (1985, PhD)
- Known for: SIFT
- Scientific career
- Fields: Computer Science; Computer Vision; Artificial Intelligence; Robotics
- Workplaces: Google; New York University; University of British Columbia
- Thesis: Perceptual Organization and Visual Recognition (1985)
- Doctoral advisor: Thomas Binford
- Doctoral students: Ken Perlin
- Website: www.cs.ubc.ca/~lowe/

David G. Lowe is a Canadian computer scientist working for Google as a senior research scientist. He was a former professor in the computer science department at the University of British Columbia and New York University.

== Works ==
Lowe is a researcher in computer vision, and is the author of the patented scale-invariant feature transform (SIFT), one of the most popular algorithms in the detection and description of image features.

== Awards and honors ==
- 2015. Lowe received the biennial PAMI Distinguished Researcher Award.
