= Scale-invariant feature operator =

Algorithm to detect local features in images

In the fields of computer vision and image analysis, the scale-invariant feature operator (or SFOP) is an algorithm to detect local features in images. The algorithm was published by Förstner et al. in 2009.

== Algorithm ==
The scale-invariant feature operator (SFOP) is based on two theoretical concepts:

- spiral model
- feature operator

Desired properties of keypoint detectors:

- Invariance and repeatability for object recognition
- Accuracy to support camera calibration
- Interpretability: Especially corners and circles, should be part of the detected keypoints (see figure).
- As few control parameters as possible with clear semantics
- Complementarity to known detectors

scale-invariant corner/circle detector.

== Theory ==
=== Maximize the weight ===
Maximize the weight $w$= 1/variance of a point $p$

w(𝐩,α,τ,σ)=(N(σ)−2)λmin(M(𝐩,α,τ,σ))Ω(𝐩,α,τ,σ)

comprising:

1. the image model

Distance d of an edge from a reference point p in a spiral feature

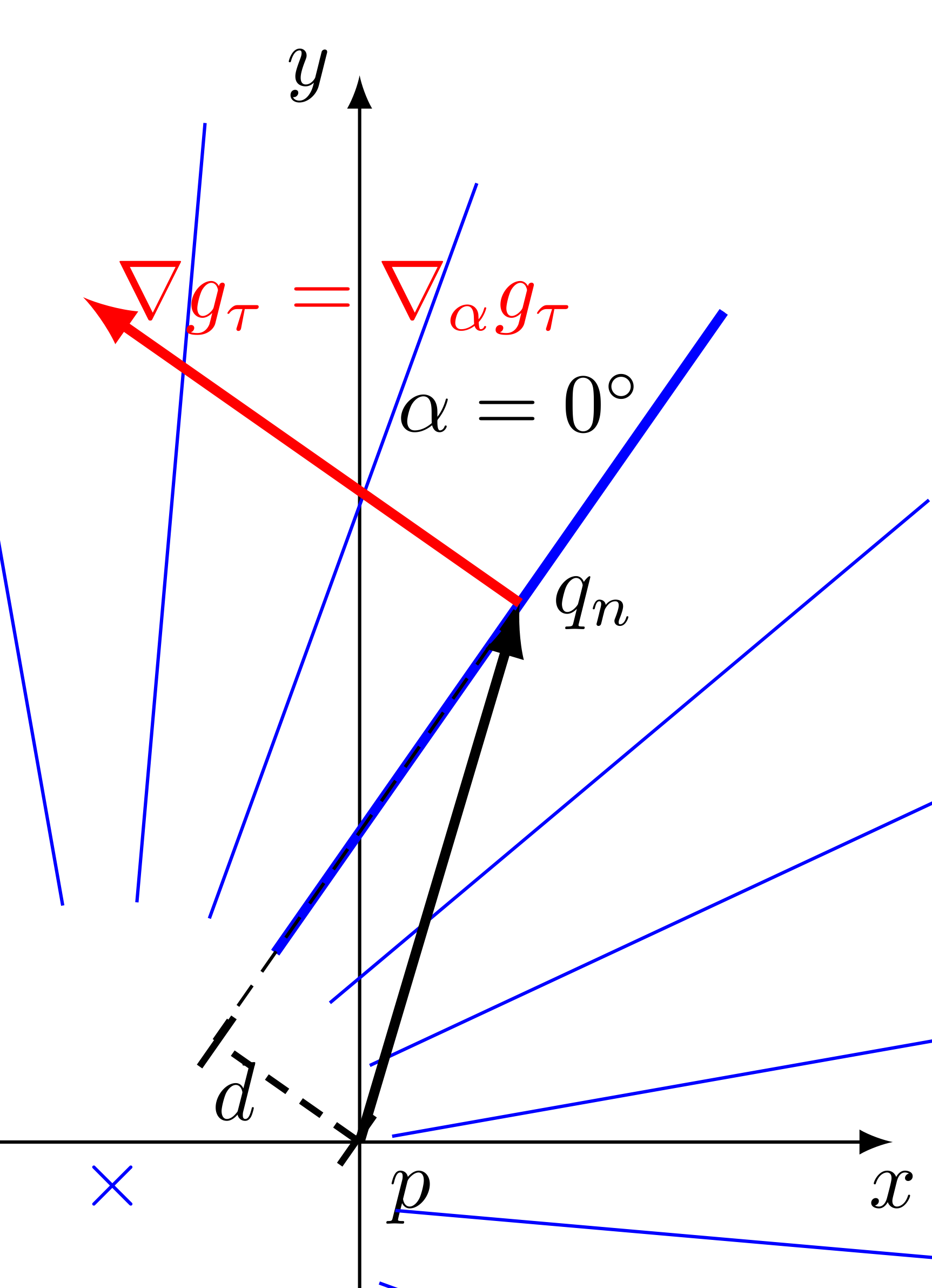

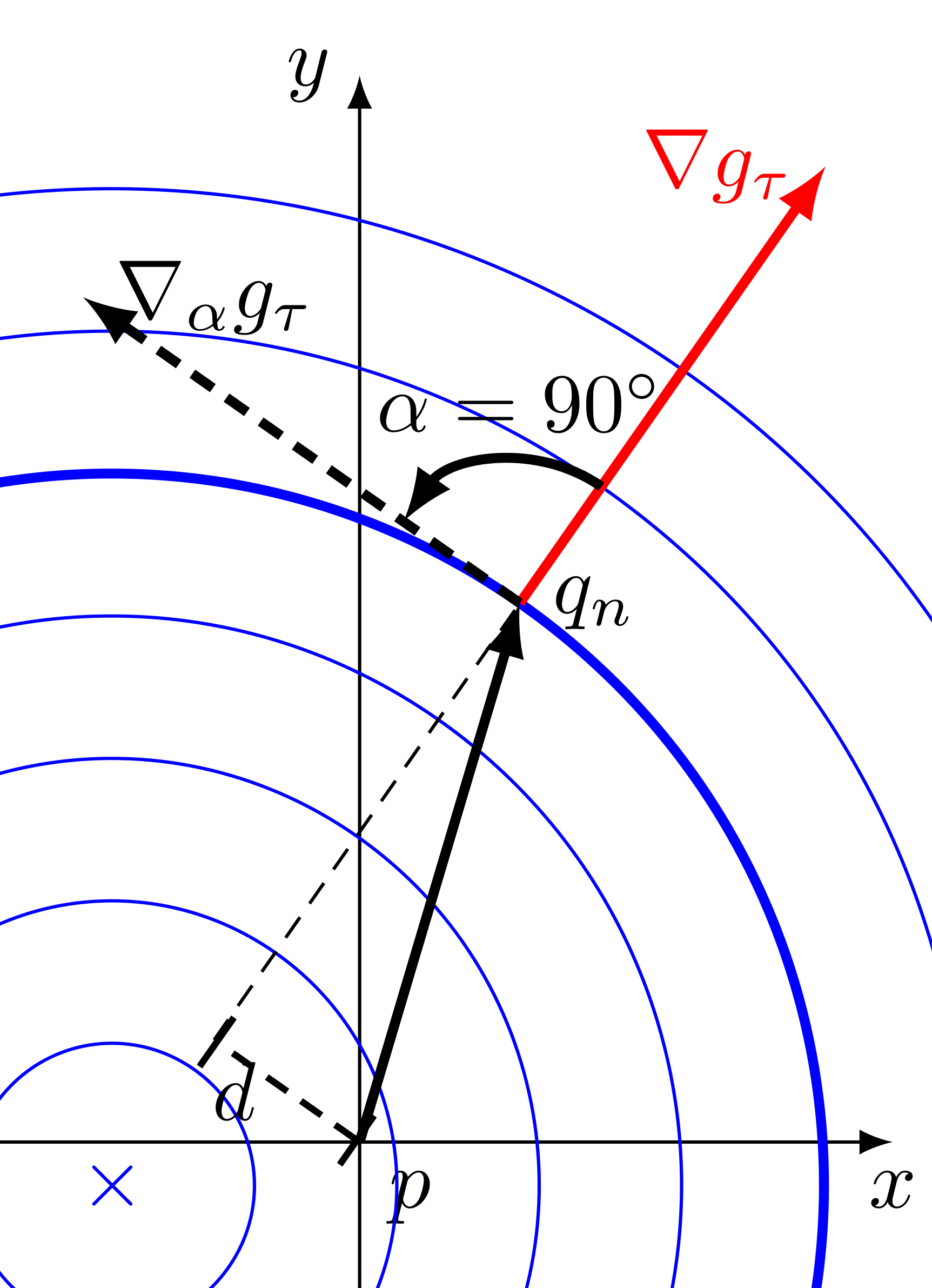

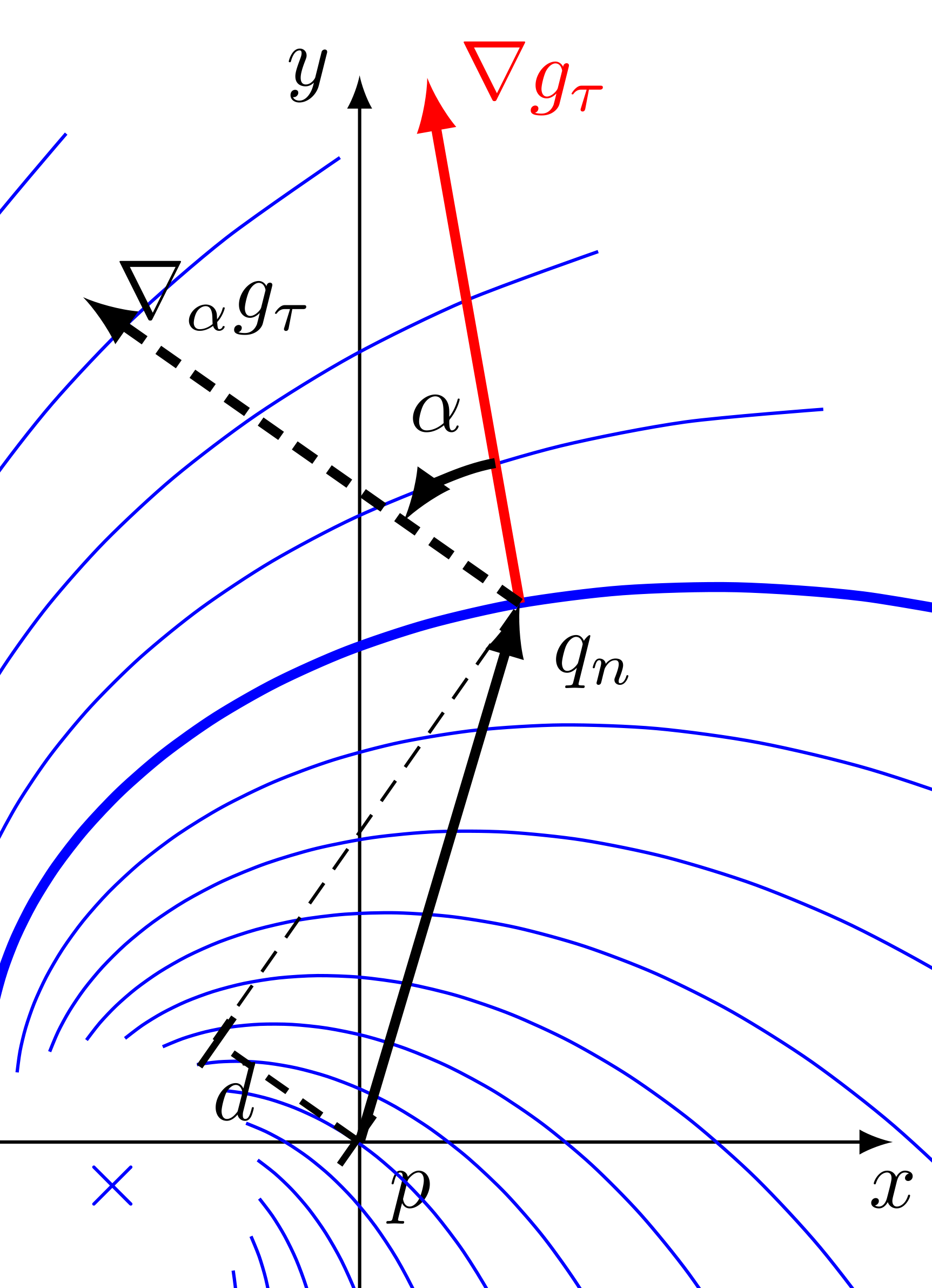

$$\begin{align}
\Omega(\mathbf{p},\alpha,\tau,\sigma)& =\sum_{n=1}^{N(\sigma)}[(\mathbf{q}_n-\mathbf{p})^T \mathbf{R}_{\alpha}\mathbf{\nabla}_T g(\mathbf{q}_n)]^2G_{\sigma}(\mathbf{q}_n-\mathbf{p}) \\
& =N(\sigma)\mathbf{tr}\left\{R_{\alpha}\mathbf{\nabla}_{\tau}\mathbf{\nabla}_{\tau}^TR_{\alpha}^T*\mathbf{p}\mathbf{p}^TG_{\sigma}(\mathbf{p})\right\}
\end{align}$$

2. the smaller eigenvalue of the structure tensor $\underbrace{M(\mathbf{p},\alpha,\tau,\sigma)}_{\text{structure tensor}}=\underbrace{G_{\sigma}(\mathbf{p})}_{\text{weighted summation}}*\underbrace{(R_{\sigma}\nabla_{\tau}\nabla_{\tau}^TR_{\sigma}^T)}_{\text{squared rotated gradients}}$

=== Reduce the search space ===
Reduce the 5-dimensional search space by

- linking the differentiation scale $\tau$ to the integration scale

$$\tau=\sigma/3$$

- solving for the optimal $\hat \alpha$ using the model

$$\Omega(\alpha) = a - b \cos(2 \alpha - 2 \alpha_0)$$

- and determining the parameters from three angles, e. g.

$$\Omega(0^\circ), \Omega(60^\circ), \Omega(120^\circ)\quad \rightarrow \quad a, b, \alpha_0 \quad \rightarrow \quad \hat\alpha$$

- pre-selection possible:

$$\alpha =  0^\circ \, \rightarrow \, \mbox{junctions}, \quad \alpha = 90^\circ \, \rightarrow \, \mbox{circular features}$$

=== Filter potential keypoints ===
- non-maxima suppression over scale, space and angle
- thresholding the isotropy $\lambda_{2(M)}$:
  eigenvalues characterize the shape of the keypoint, smallest eigenvalue has to be larger than threshold $T_{\lambda}$
  derived from noise variance $V(n)$ and significance level $S$:

$$T_\lambda(V(n), \tau, \sigma, S) = \frac{N(\sigma)}{16 \pi \tau^4} V(n) \chi^2_{2,S}$$

== Algorithm ==
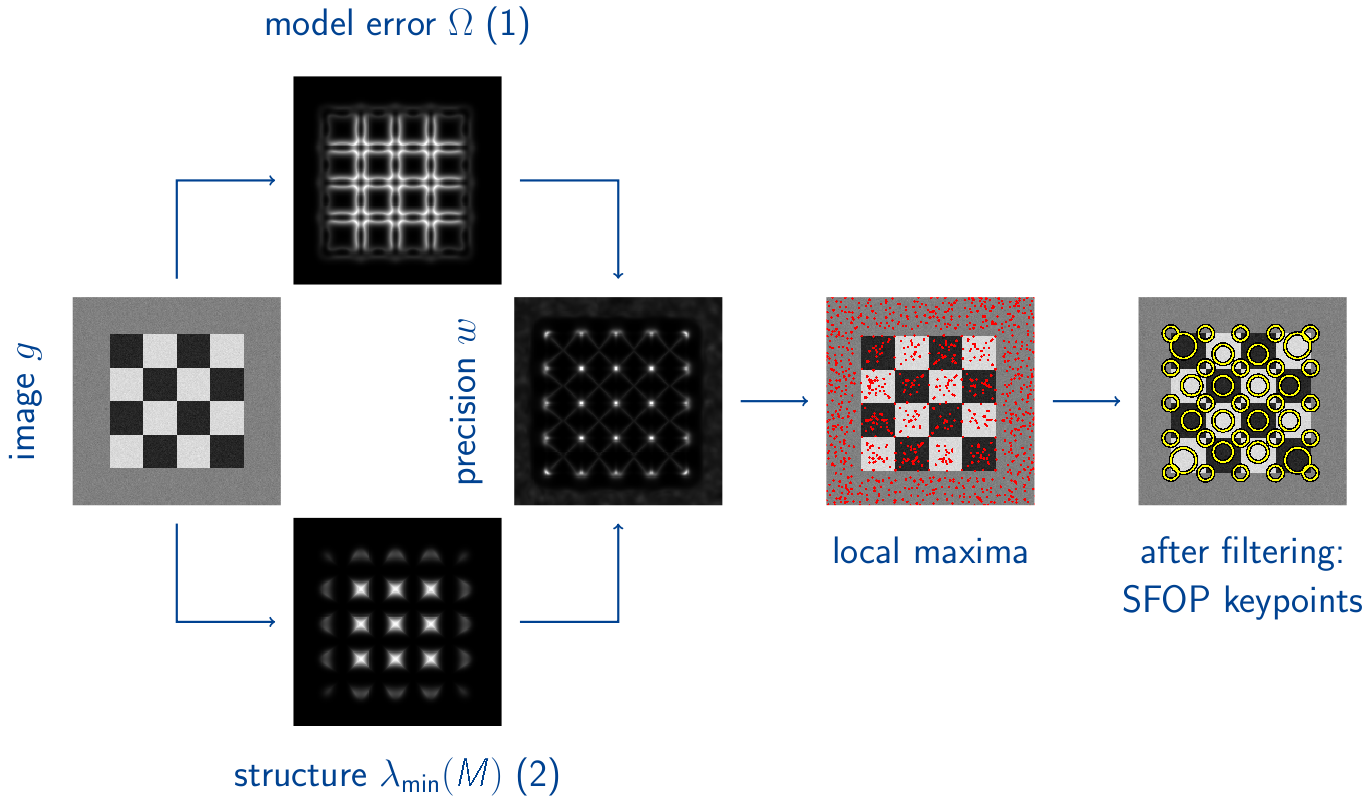
Algorithm

== Results ==
=== Interpretability of SFOP keypoints ===
Results of different detectors on a Siemens star

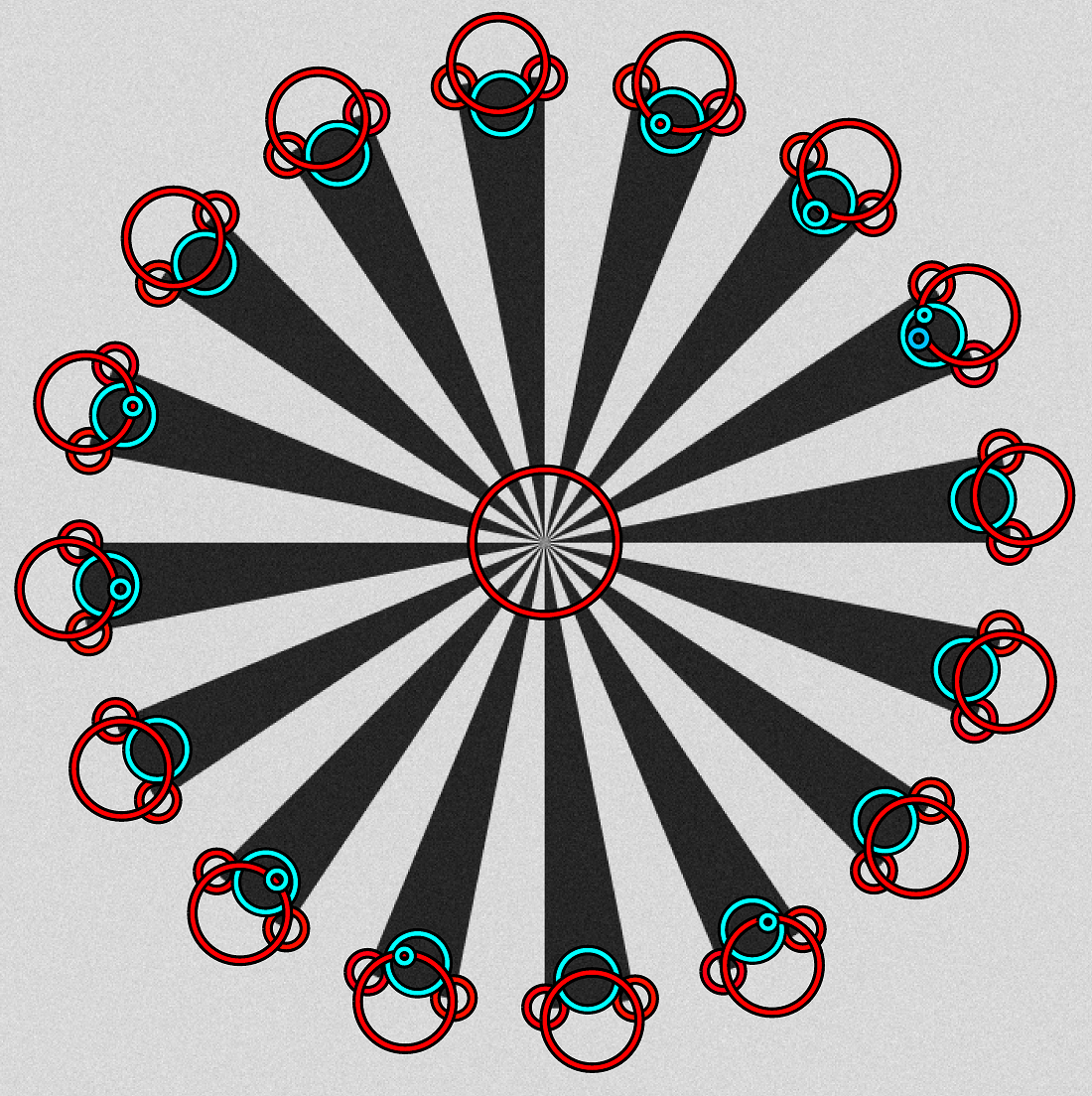
Sfop: junctions red, circular features cyan

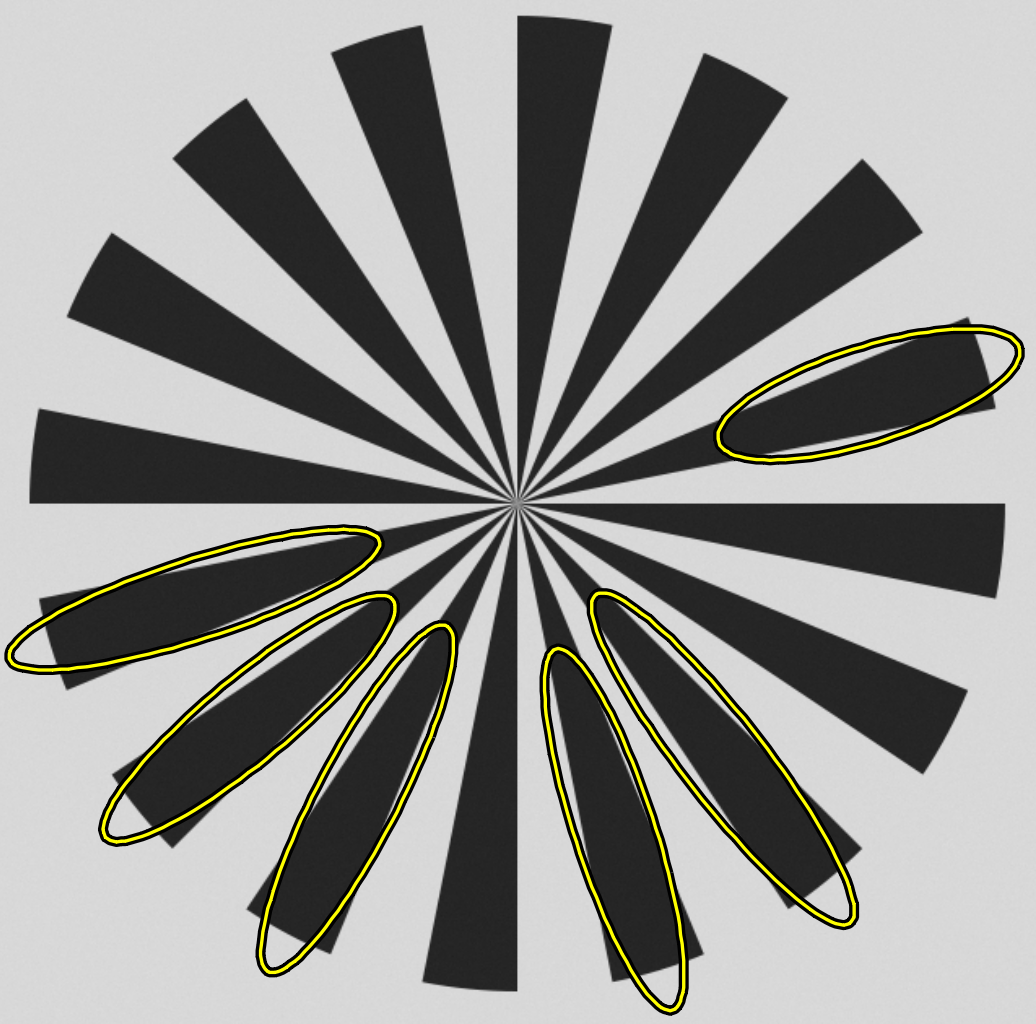
Edge-based Regions

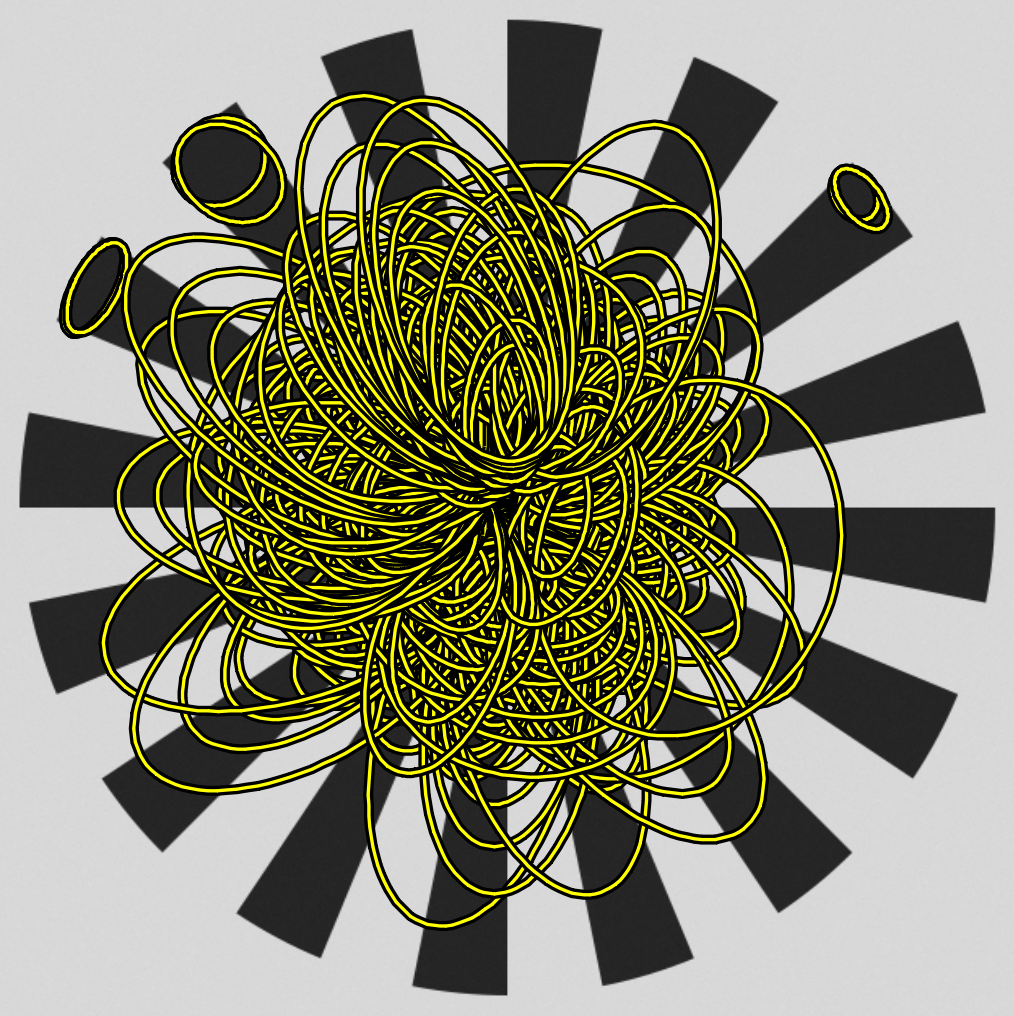
Intensity-based Regions

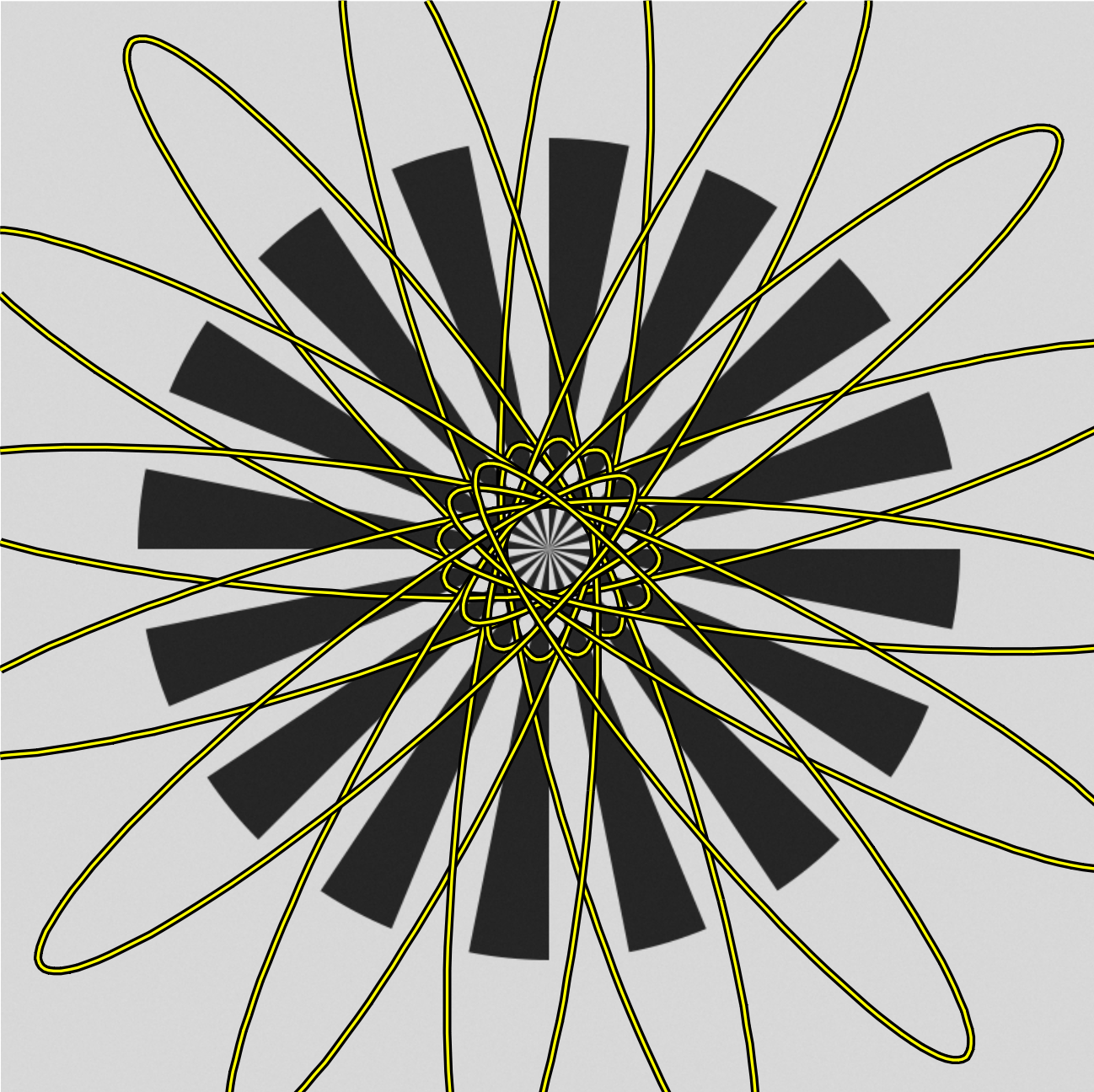
MSER

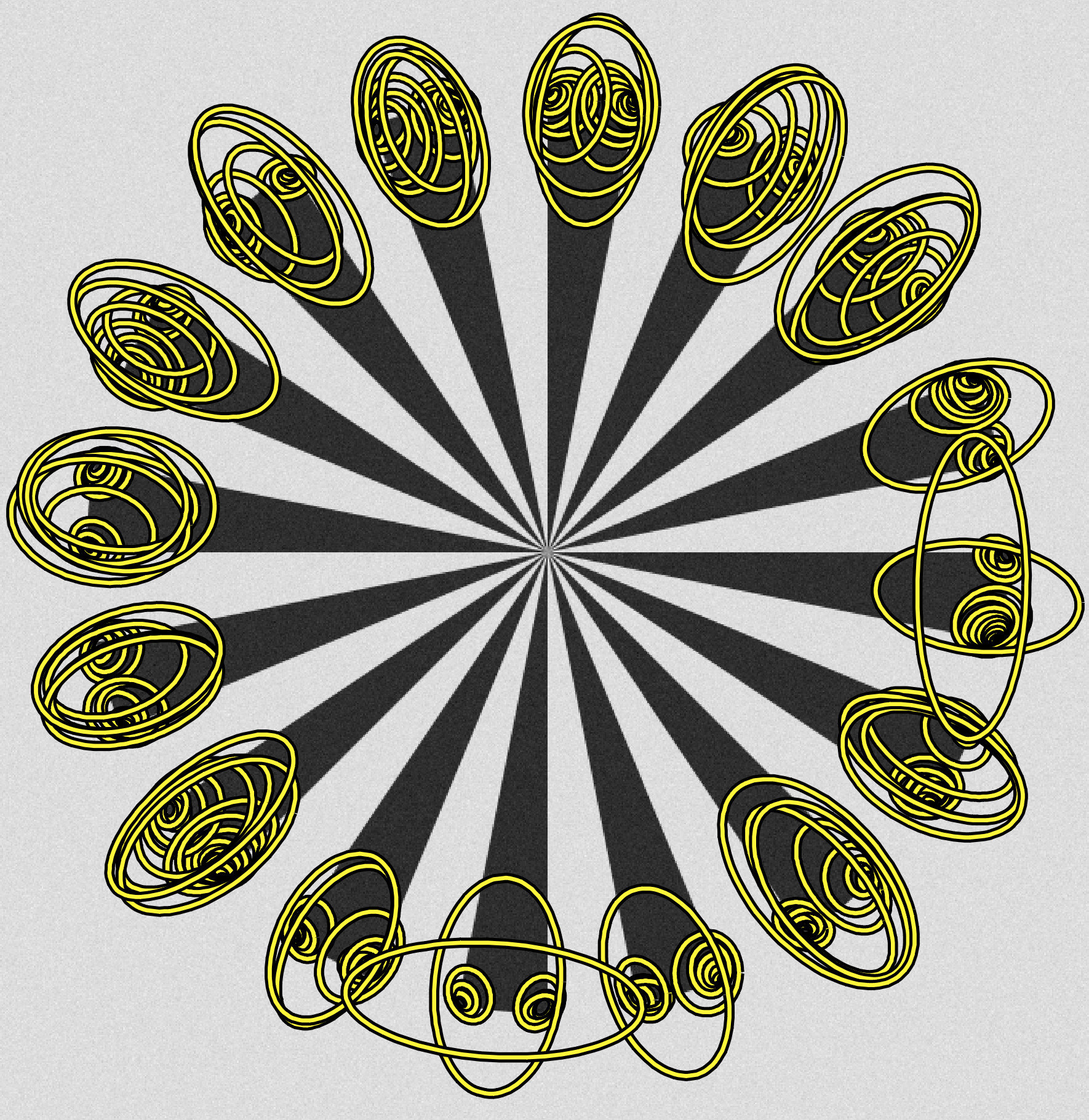
Harris affine

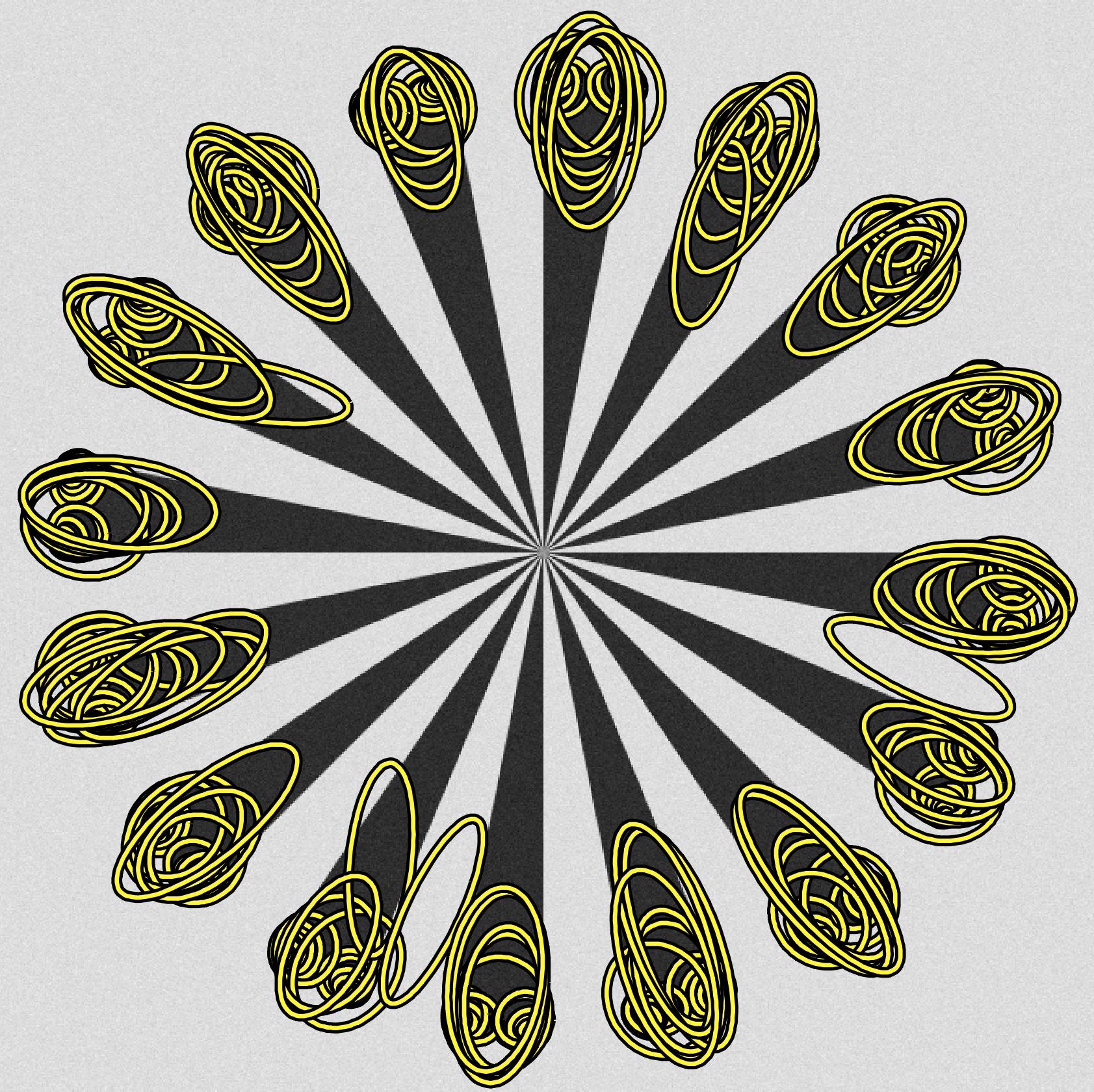
Hessian affine

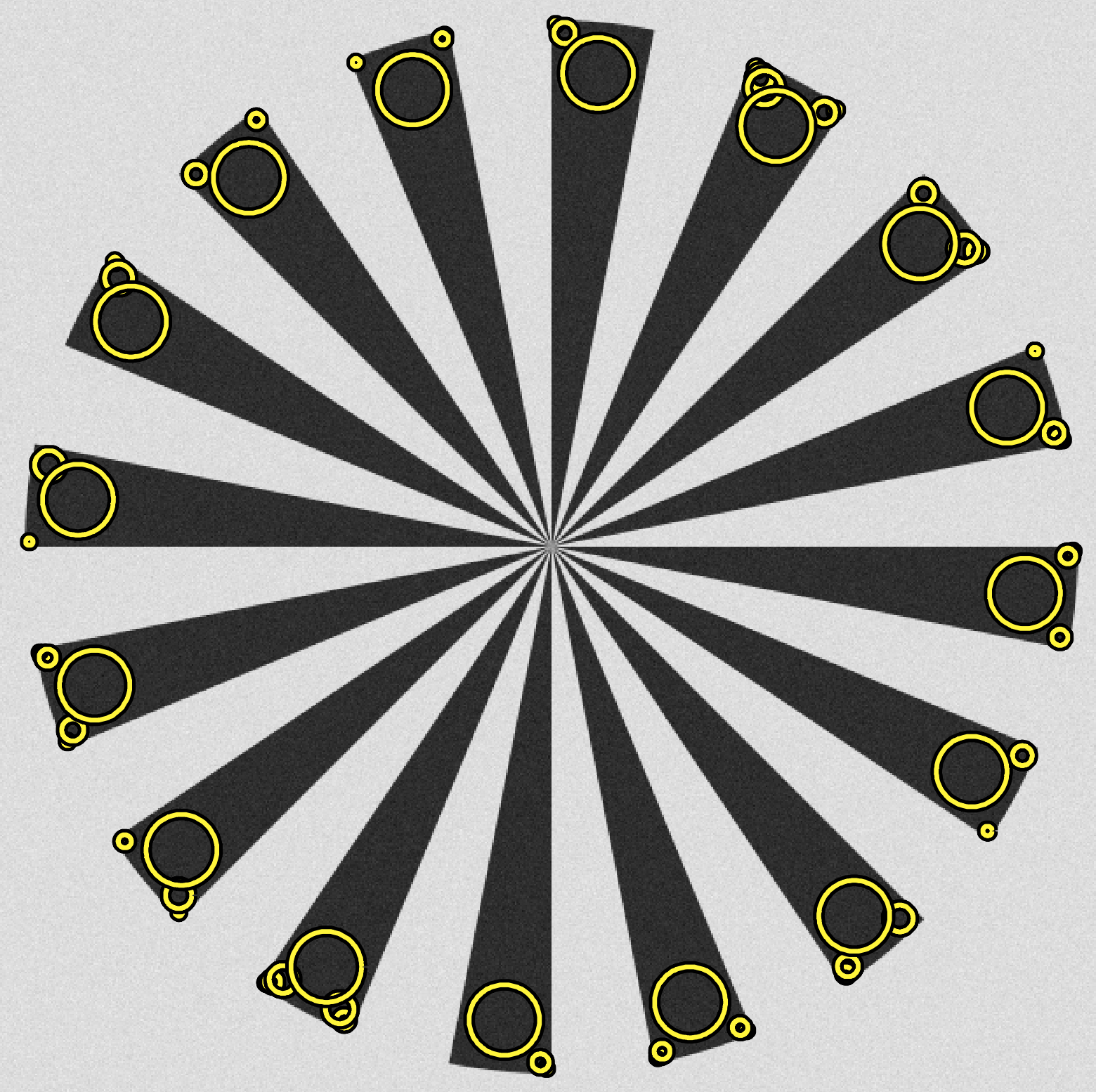
Lowe

== See also ==
- Corner detection
- Feature detection (computer vision)
