= Local energy-based shape histogram =

Local energy-based shape histogram (LESH) is a proposed image descriptor in computer vision. It can be used to get a description of the underlying shape. The LESH feature descriptor is built on local energy model of feature perception, see e.g. phase congruency for more details. It encodes the underlying shape by accumulating local energy of the underlying signal along several filter orientations, several local histograms from different parts of the image/patch are generated and concatenated together into a 128-dimensional compact spatial histogram. It is designed to be scale invariant. The LESH features can be used in applications like shape-based image retrieval, medical image processing, object detection, and pose estimation.

== See also ==
- Feature detection (computer vision)
- Scale-invariant feature transform
- Speeded up robust features
- Gradient Location Orientation Histogram
