= BBF =

BBF may refer to:

== Science and technology ==
- Back button focus, a photography technique
- Behavioral and Brain Functions, a journal
- Best bin first, a type of search algorithm
- Broadband Forum, a computer networking industry consortium

== Sport ==
- Belgian Badminton Federation
- Bobby Bowden Field, the football field at Florida State University in Tallahassee
- British Baseball Federation
- British Basketball Federation

== Other uses ==
- Boston By Foot, a non-profit tour organization
- Paris Hilton's British Best Friend, a reality television series
