= AceMedia =

Content Management Software Package

aceMedia is a multimedia content management software package that was funded by the European Union, and developed from 2004 to 2007. The final review was presented in February 2008, and AceMedia is now available in two editions, personal and commercial.

== Features ==
Features of the aceMedia software include:

- it runs on several platforms - PC, set-top box, mobile phone, web interface
- it manages different users that may that share content, and their associated access rights
- it includes image, language and video analysis functions that can automatically annotate content or handle textual queries in natural language

It was developed by 15 European partners that can be classified in:

- research laboratories
- high-tech companies that may re-use or sell (parts of) the software
- companies that manage image or video databases, that provide the test content

=== The PCS app ===
The PCS is a GUI where the user can import images and videos, organize in folders, annotate them and call content analysis tools on them.

The content analysis tools include:

- a person detector that finds people standing in images
- a face analysis method that finds and recognizes faces in images
- a classifier that determines properties on a whole image (like whether it was taken from inside or outside, whether it was by night, etc.)
- a segmentation engine that detects textured areas on images (like trees, sky, rock, etc.)

=== The CCM app ===
It includes a web interface from which users can rate images and videos, and search them. Searching can be done with different criteria:

- textual search. Text queries in various languages are "understood" by the system, and searches are performed using all available information, including that from the image analysis algorithms
- global image similarity, using global image descriptors
- precise image similarity: the user can define image regions (s)he is interested in on an example image, and the system finds the most relevant images

A reasoning system combines annotations to make sure they are coherent. For example, on an image, a sky region is supposed to be above a rock region.

== Architecture ==
The PCS application and most of the CCM application are based on a Java framework that manages the content (stored as files) and the metadata (stored in a MySQL database).

The content analysis tools are implemented in C or C++ and called by the framework.

The server side of the web interface is in C#.

== Future ==
Some technologies developed during the lifespan of the project will be used by the participating companies. The main framework is to be published in open-source form.

== See also ==
- Content management system
