= GLOH =

GLOH (Gradient Location and Orientation Histogram) is a robust image descriptor that can be used in computer vision tasks. It is a SIFT-like descriptor that considers more spatial regions for the histograms. An intermediate vector is computed from 17 location and 16 orientation bins, for a total of 272-dimensions. Principal components analysis (PCA) is then used to reduce the vector size to 128 (same size as SIFT descriptor vector).

== See also ==
- Scale-invariant feature transform
- Speeded Up Robust Features
- LESH – Local Energy-based Shape Histogram
- Feature detection (computer vision)
