= Myron L. Good =

American physicist

Myron Lindsay (Bud) Good (October 25, 1923 – February 26, 1999) was an American physicist, a professor of physics at the University of Wisconsin–Madison and Stony Brook University.

Good's research interests spanned a broad range of topics in particle physics. He did important work on muon-catalyzed fusion, Kaon regeneration, strange particles, diffraction of particle beams, W boson phenomenology, and particle accelerator technology. Outside of particle physics, he also developed a theory of pulsars as rotating neutron stars.

Good did undergraduate studies at the University at Buffalo and Cornell University, and received his Ph.D. in 1951 from Duke University for research on beta decay. His Ph.D. thesis was supervised by Henry W. Newson. After working as a research scientist at the University of California, Berkeley, Good became a faculty member at the University of Wisconsin in 1959, and moved to Stony Brook in 1967. At Stony Brook, he headed the experimental particle physics group; he retired in 1992.

He was elected in 1963 a Fellow of the American Physical Society. His doctoral students include Thomas Binford and Stanley Wojcicki.
