= Herbert Bay =

Swiss computer scientist

Herbert Bay is a Swiss computer scientist known for his work in computer vision. He is a co-inventor of the Speeded-Up Robust Features (SURF) algorithm, a method for fast and robust interest point detection and description, which was first published in 2006 and later recognized with the Koenderink Prize at the European Conference on Computer Vision in 2016. Bay also co-founded Kooaba, an ETH Zurich spin-off focused on mobile image recognition technology.

== History ==
In 2006, Bay co-authored the initial publication of the SURF algorithm with Tinne Tuytelaars and Luc Van Gool. The work, presented at the 9th European Conference on Computer Vision in Graz, Austria, proposed a method for fast and robust interest point detection and description. That same year, Bay co-founded Kooaba, a Zurich-based image recognition startup spun out of ETH Zurich. In a Swissinfo article, Bay described the company’s goal as building a “visual Google,” allowing users to photograph objects and access related multimedia content. The company developed a database of millions of images and ran promotional campaigns with commercial partners. Bay chose to base the company in Zurich rather than Silicon Valley, citing strong local talent and infrastructure.

In a 2008 Handelszeitung article, Kooaba was described as offering mobile image recognition that worked through object detection rather than barcodes. The technology, originally demonstrated by Bay at ETH Zurich in 2005, allowed users to photograph items and receive associated digital content. Clients included EasyJet, EMI Music, and the newspaper 20 Minutes in Romandy, which used the technology in various print media applications.

In 2009, Bay and his Kooaba co-founder were named “Zürcher des Jahres” (Zurichers of the Year) in recognition of their work. Kooaba was later acquired by the U.S. technology company Qualcomm.

In a 2010 article by the Neue Zürcher Zeitung, Bay and co-founder Till Quack discussed their goal of turning Kooaba into a “visual Google,” enabling users to take photographs of real-world objects with a smartphone and instantly retrieve relevant information. Bay acknowledged the ambitious nature of the project, comparing it to early aviation efforts that initially fell short of reaching the moon.

In 2016, Bay and his co-authors received the Koenderink Prize at the European Conference on Computer Vision, awarded for their 2006 paper on the SURF algorithm as a fundamental contribution that had "withstood the test of time".
