= Best bin first =

Best bin first is a search algorithm that is designed to efficiently find an approximate solution to the nearest neighbor search problem in very-high-dimensional spaces. The algorithm is based on a variant of the k-d tree search algorithm which makes indexing higher-dimensional spaces possible. Best bin first is an approximate algorithm which returns the nearest neighbor for a large fraction of queries and a very close neighbor otherwise.

== Differences from k-d tree ==
- Bins are looked in increasing order of distance from the query point. The distance to a bin is defined as a minimal distance to any point of its boundary. This is implemented with priority queue.
- Search a fixed number of nearest candidates and stop.
- A speedup of two orders of magnitude is typical.
