= Thomas Binford =

American computer vision researcher

Thomas Oriel Binford has been a researcher in image analysis and computer vision since 1967. He developed a model-based approach to computer vision in which complex objects are represented as collections of generalized cylinders. His results are reflected in work in other areas of research, including the interpretation of complex scenes using invariants and quasi-invariants, inference rules and evidential reasoning in extended Bayes networks of symbolic geometric constraints, the SUCCESSOR system, a portable, intelligent vision system, stereo and visual robot navigation, segmentation and feature estimation in complex images, color image analysis, surface material analysis, and image compression. He has led the development of numerous computer vision systems, including systems successfully employed in brain surgery on humans, high-precision automated machining, and helicopter navigation.

Binford received a Ph.D. in particle physics in 1965 from the University of Wisconsin–Madison, under the supervision of Myron L. Good; his thesis was entitled "Angular Distribution and Polarization of Neutral Hyperons Produced in Association with Neutral Kaons". He was a Fulbright Scholar at the Tata Institute of Fundamental Research in Mumbai, India from 1965 to 1966, and a research scientist at the MIT Artificial Intelligence Laboratory from 1966 to 1970.

From 1970 to 2000 he was a professor of computer science at Stanford University; in 2000 he retired to become an emeritus professor. While at Stanford, Professor Binford supervised more than 40 PhD theses while leading research in computer vision, artificial intelligence, medical image processing, radar image understanding, robotics, industrial inspection, and manufacturing; notable students of Binford's include Rodney Brooks and Jitendra Malik.

Since retiring from active research at Stanford, Binford has founded and is chairman and chief technology officer of Read-Ink Technologies Pvt. Ltd., a company in Bangalore, India specializing in online handwriting recognition software. In 1994 Thomas Binford was elected a Fellow of the Association for the Advancement of Artificial Intelligence "for his role as a founding father in the field of computer vision and model-based perception in robotics; and for his many contributions to the fields".
