= Image space =

Image space may refer to:

- Image space (optics) - the optical space coordinatizing the visual representation or component of a scene
- Image (mathematics) - the set of results of a function, the output object of a morphism
