= PatchMatch =

Algorithm for manipulating images

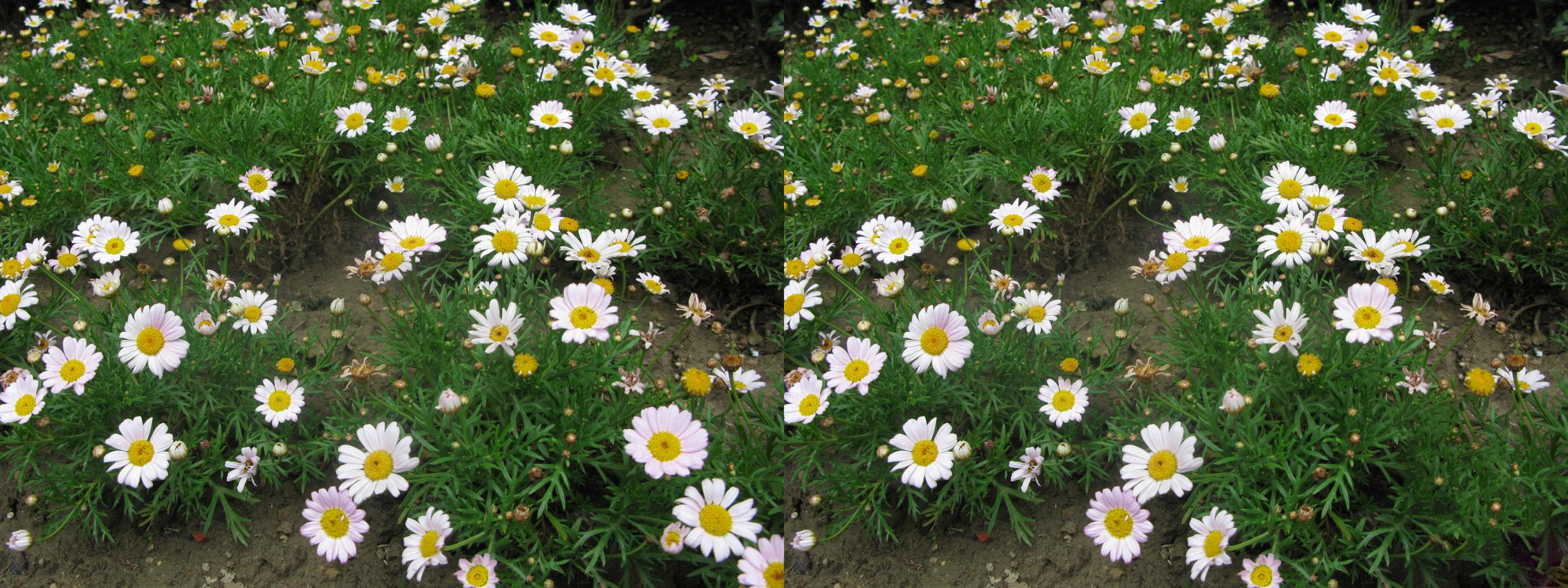
A comparison showing flowers (bottom right) removed from a photo using PatchMatch

PatchMatch is an algorithm used to quickly find correspondences (or matches) between small square regions (or patches) of an image. It has various applications in image editing, such as reshuffling or removing objects from images or altering their aspect ratios without cropping or noticeably stretching them. PatchMatch was first presented in a 2011 paper by researchers at Princeton University.

== Algorithm ==
The goal of the algorithm is to find the patch correspondence by defining a nearest-neighbor field (NNF) as a function $f : \mathbb{R}^2 \to \mathbb{R}^2$ of offsets, which is over all possible matches of patch (location of patch centers) in image A, for some distance function of two patches $D$. So, for a given patch coordinate $a$ in image $A$ and its corresponding nearest neighbor $b$ in image $B$, $f(a)$ is simply $b - a$. However, if we search for every point in image $B$, the work will be too hard to complete. So the following algorithm is done in a randomized approach in order to accelerate the calculation speed. The algorithm has three main components. Initially, the nearest-neighbor field is filled with either random offsets or some prior information. Next, an iterative update process is applied to the NNF, in which good patch offsets are propagated to adjacent pixels, followed by random search in the neighborhood of the best offset found so far. Independent of these three components, the algorithm also uses a coarse-to-fine approach by building an image pyramid to obtain a better result.

=== Initialization ===
When initializing with random offsets, we use independent uniform samples across the full range of image $B$. This algorithm avoids using an initial guess from the previous level of the pyramid because in this way the algorithm can avoid being trapped in local minima.

=== Iteration ===
After initialization, the algorithm attempted to perform iterative process of improving the $NNF$. The iterations examine the offsets in scan order (from left to right, top to bottom), and each undergoes propagation followed by random search.

=== Propagation ===
We attempt to improve $f(x,y)$ using the known offsets of $f(x-1, y)$ and $f(x, y-1)$, assuming that the patch offsets are likely to be the same. That is, the algorithm will take new value for $f(x,y)$ to be $\arg \min \limits _{(x,y)} {D(f(x, y)), D(f(x - 1, y)), D(f(x, y - 1))}$. So if $f(x, y)$ has a correct mapping and is in a coherent region $R$, then all of $R$ below and to the right of $f(x, y)$ will be filled with the correct mapping. Alternatively, on even iterations, the algorithm search for different direction, fill the new value to be $\arg \min \limits _{(x,y)} \{D(f(x, y)), D(f(x + 1, y)), D(f(x, y + 1))\}$.

=== Random search ===
Let $v_0 = f(x, y)$, we attempt to improve$f(x, y)$ by testing a sequence of candidate offsets at an exponentially decreasing distance from $v_0$

$$u_i = v_0+w\alpha^iR_i$$

where $R_i$ is a uniform random in $[-1, 1] \times [-1, 1]$, $w$ is a large window search radius which will be set to maximum picture size, and $\alpha$ is a fixed ratio often assigned as 1/2. This part of the algorithm allows the $f(x,y)$ to jump out of local minimum through random process.

=== Halting criterion ===
The often used halting criterion is set the iteration times to be about 4–5. Even with low iteration, the algorithm works well.

== See also ==
- Nearest neighbor search
