= Local ternary patterns =

Image processing process

Local ternary patterns (LTP) are an extension of local binary patterns (LBP). Unlike LBP, it does not threshold the pixels into 0 and 1, rather it uses a threshold constant to threshold pixels into three values. Considering k as the threshold constant, c as the value of the center pixel, a neighboring pixel p, the result of threshold is:

$$\begin{cases}
1, & \text{if } p>c+k \\
0, & \text{if } p>c-k \text{ and } p<c+k \\
-1 & \text{if } p<c-k \\
\end{cases}$$

In this way, each thresholded pixel has one of the three values. Neighboring pixels are combined after thresholding into a ternary pattern. Computing a histogram of these ternary values will result in a large range, so the ternary pattern is split into two binary patterns. Histograms are concatenated to generate a descriptor double the size of LBP.

== See also ==
- Local binary patterns
