= Joint compatibility branch and bound =

Computer vision algorithm

Joint compatibility branch and bound (JCBB) is an algorithm in computer vision and robotics commonly used for data association in simultaneous localization and mapping. JCBB measures the joint compatibility of a set of pairings that successfully rejects spurious matchings and is hence known to be robust in complex environments.
