= Optical space =

Optical spaces are mathematical spaces, often endowed with coordinate systems, that facilitate the modelling of optical systems as mathematical transformations. An optical space is a mathematical coordinate system such as a Cartesian coordinate system associated with a refractive index. The analysis of optical systems is greatly simplified by the use of optical spaces which enable designers to place the origin of a coordinate system at any of several convenient locations. In the design of optical systems two optical spaces, object space and image space, are always employed. Additional intermediate spaces are often used as well.

Optical spaces extend to infinity in all directions. The object space does not exist only on the "input" side of the system, nor the image space only on the "output" side. Spaces in this sense can be considered points of view. All optical spaces thus overlap completely to infinity in all directions. Typically, the origin and at least some of the coordinate axes of each space are different, providing different perspectives to the designer. It may not be possible to discern from an illustration to which space a point, ray, or plane belongs unless some convention is adopted. A common convention uses capital letters like X, Y, or Z to label points and lower case letters like a, b, and c to indicate distances. Unprimed letters like t or v indicate object space and primed letters like t′ or v′ indicate image space. Intermediate spaces are indicated by additional primes such as r″, z″, or q″. The same letter is used to indicate points or distances that share a conjugate relationship. The only exception is the use of F and F′ to indicate respectively object and image space focal points (which are not conjugate). The term "object point" does not necessarily refer to a point on a specific object but rather to a point in object space; similarly for "image point".

One may wonder how an object point can exist on the "output" side of an optical system or conversely how an image point could be located on the "input" side of an optical system. The answer in both cases is that the points are virtual; they do not physically exist. Optical spaces are divided into real and virtual parts. Thus, an object point on the "output" side of the system is in the virtual part of object space and is referred to as a virtual object point. Object points on the "input" side are in the real part of object space and are real object points. The situation is reversed for image points.

It is common practice to designate the horizontal axis of an optical space as the z-axis with the positive direction left to right. Similarly, the y-axis is vertical with the positive direction upward.

== See also ==
- Collinearity equation
