= RHEM =

2002 video game

- Developer: Knut Müller
- Publishers: Got Game Entertainment; Micro Application
- Engine: Macromedia Director
- Platforms: Windows, Macintosh
- Release: Windows: NA: August 2002 (Indie); EU: May 10, 2003; NA: June 28, 2003; Mac: WW: July 2003
- Genre: Graphic adventure
- Mode: Single player

RHEM is an adventure game from Knut Müller and Got Game Entertainment. It is distributed as a Macromedia Director file. The player explores a barren, maze-like landscape of water ponds, walkways, and brick buildings with the aid of a partial map. The game has several puzzles involving machines and symbols. There are three sequels, called RHEM 2: The Cave, RHEM 3: The Secret Library and RHEM 4: The Golden Fragments.

RHEM, like Myst, is made up of a series of static images.

The object of the game is to locate four pieces of a letter, which must be pieced together.

== Plot ==
The player enters the city of RHEM on a railway car. The car goes into a dead-end station with a rotatable track. The player is unable to leave because the track is not yet rotated. While the player is on his way to the switch to rotate the station track, a previous prisoner of RHEM beats the player to the switch he was after and leaves in the player's railway car. The player must then wander the city of Rhem in search of a second railway station.

== Production ==
According to Müller, the following development tools are used to develop RHEM

Graphics:

- Bryce 2-6
- StrataVision 3D
- Silo
- Amorphium
- Final Cut Pro
- Motion

Sound:

- SoundEdit
- Peak
- Logic Pro

Scripting:

- Macromedia Director

== Reception ==
Reception

Aggregate score
Aggregator	Score
Metacritic	58/100

Review scores
Publication	Score
Adventure Gamers	2/5
GameZone	6.5/10

RHEM received "mixed" reviews according to the review aggregation website Metacritic. Robert Gerbino of GameZone praised its similarity to Myst in terms of its puzzles but criticized the graphics and repetitive gameplay.
