= Alexander Berg =

American computer scientist

Alexander C. Berg
- Education: Johns Hopkins University (BA, MA); University of California, Berkeley (PhD)
- Known for: ImageNet Large Scale Visual Recognition Challenge; SSD; Segment Anything
- Spouse: Tamara Berg
- Awards: Marr Prize (2013); PAMI Mark Everingham Prize (2016)
- Scientific career
- Fields: Computer vision Machine learning
- Workplaces: University of California, Irvine; Meta AI; University of North Carolina at Chapel Hill
- Thesis: Shape Matching and Object Recognition (2005)
- Doctoral advisor: Jitendra Malik
- Website: acberg.com

Alexander C. Berg is an associate professor in computer science at UC Irvine. Before that he was an Assistant and Associate Professor at the University of North Carolina at Chapel Hill. He specializes in web mining as well as machine learning and computer vision.

== Education ==
Berg obtained his master's and bachelor's degrees from Johns Hopkins University in 1994 and then got his PhD at University of California, Berkeley in 2005 under Jitendra Malik. He stayed at Berkeley as a postdoc from 2006 to 2007, and in February 2007 he became both research scientist and visiting professor at the same place and then became Yahoo! Researcher at Yahoo! where he worked till May 2008.

== Career ==
As a Yahoo! Researcher, Berg teamed up with Subhransu Maji and Jitendra Malik of University of California, Berkeley to develop kernelized SVMs. In October 2011 he and colleagues developed two kinds of face recognition software called FaceTracer and PubFig.

Berg worked as a research scientist at Facebook AI Research, later Meta AI, before joining the Donald Bren School of Information and Computer Sciences in winter 2022.

== Research ==
=== ImageNet ===
Berg is a co-organiser of the ImageNet Large Scale Visual Recognition Challenge. According to an account of the project's origins, he approached Fei-Fei Li at a computer vision conference in Kyoto in 2009 with the suggestion that entrants be required to indicate where in an image an object appeared rather than only whether it was present; Li invited him to join the effort, and the two went on to publish repeatedly on the dataset together with Jia Deng. He is among the authors of the paper documenting the benchmark and analysing five years of results from it.

=== Object detection and segmentation ===
With collaborators at Google and the University of North Carolina at Chapel Hill, Berg co-authored SSD, a detector that predicts object classes and bounding-box offsets in a single pass of a convolutional network, dispensing with a separate region-proposal stage.

At Meta he was one of the authors of Segment Anything, a promptable segmentation model released together with a dataset of about one billion masks over eleven million images, designed to transfer to new image distributions without task-specific training.

== Personal life ==
Berg is married to fellow computer vision researcher Tamara Berg.

== Awards ==
- 2013 – Marr Prize, awarded at the International Conference on Computer Vision in Sydney for the paper "From Large Scale Image Categorization to Entry-Level Categories", shared with Tamara Berg, Vicente Ordonez, Jia Deng and Yejin Choi
- 2015 – National Science Foundation Faculty Early Career Development (CAREER) award, for the project "Situated Recognition: Learning to understand our local visual environment"
- 2016 – PAMI Mark Everingham Prize, shared with Jia Deng, Fei-Fei Li, Olga Russakovsky and the wider ImageNet team
