= Hell Pie =

2022 video game

- Steam cover
- Developer: Sluggerfly
- Publisher: Headup Games
- Engine: Unreal Engine 4
- Platforms: Nintendo Switch; PlayStation 4 PlayStation 5 Windows; Xbox One; Xbox Series X/S
- Release: July 21, 2022
- Genre: 3D platformer
- Mode: Single-player

Hell Pie is an action-adventure 3D platformer video game developed by German studio Sluggerfly and published by Headup Games. Players controls Nate, a demon who is tasked to collect ingredients for Satan's birthday pie. The game became notable for its use of toilet humor, profanity and extreme graphic violence, with various publications comparing the style to Conker's Bad Fur Day.

Hell Pie released on July 21, 2022 for the Nintendo Switch, PlayStation 4, PlayStation 5, Xbox One, Xbox Series X/S and Windows. It received generally favorable reviews.

== Gameplay ==
Hell Pie is an action-adventure collectathon 3D platformer. The game follows Nate, the "Demon of Bad Taste" who is tasked by Satan to make him a birthday pie. He then meets Nugget, a cherub who can be used as a mid-air grapple, providing the player with increased aerial mobility that can be upgraded as the game progresses. The goal of the game is to collect all ingredients for the pie, located in the game's levels. The levels are populated with hostile mobs, such as Shit Staffels, anthropomorphic feces implied to also be Nazis. Nate and Nugget's appearance can be changed with cosmetic outfits collected in the hub world or bought with gems acquired within the levels. Meat candy can be collected in the levels, increasing the player's health and the amount of mid-air swings that can be performed with Nugget. Unicorns can be found in the hub world, which can be sacrificed for sets of horns that give the player a new power and a tutorial level for that power. The player may choose to censor certain content in the settings.

== Reception ==
Reception

Aggregate scores
Aggregator	Score
Metacritic	78/100 (PC)
OpenCritic	43% recommend

Review scores
Publication	Score
Nintendo World Report	6/10
NME	3/5
PC Games (DE)	7/10

Hell Pie received generally favorable reviews, according to the review aggregator website Metacritic. PC Games gave the game a rating of 7/10, calling it "charmingly disgusting". NME gave the game 3 out of 5 stars, praising the gameplay, levels and controls, while opining that the collectathon gameplay is "aimed squarely at fans of the genre" and the gross-out humor might not appeal to everyone. Nintendo World Report rated the game 6/10, complimenting the level design and humor, while criticizing the low resolution and unstable frame rate on the Nintendo Switch.
