= Andrea Frome =

American computer scientist

- Education: University of Mary Washington (BS); University of California, Berkeley (PhD)
- Scientific career
- Fields: Computer Science
- Workplaces: Google
- Thesis: Learning Local Distance Functions for Exemplar-Based Object Recognition (2007)
- Doctoral advisor: Jitendra Malik

Andrea Frome is an American computer scientist who works in computer vision and machine learning.

== Education ==
Frome attended the University of Mary Washington for her undergraduate work, receiving a BS in environmental science in 1996. After a few years working in environmental consulting, she changed fields to computer science. She received her doctorate from the University of California, Berkeley in Computer Vision and Machine Learning in 2007 under the supervision of Jitendra Malik.

== Career ==
After her PhD, she worked at Google for seven years, where she was involved in developing the AI used to blur out faces and license plates in Google Street View.

After leaving Google in 2015, she worked for a short time at Nuna Inc., before joining the technology team of Hillary Clinton's 2016 presidential campaign. At the end of the Clinton campaign, she joined Clarifai as director of research. In 2018, she returned to Google to become one of the founding members of a new research laboratory in Ghana.

Frome has over 4,000 citations in the fields of computer vision, deep learning, and machine learning.

== Activism ==
In 2019, she co-signed a letter addressed to Amazon regarding its facial analysis software and alleged biases in its implementation and interpretation by police departments, etc.
