= Twin Sector =

2009 video game

- Developer(s): DNS Development
- Publisher(s): Got Game Entertainment, Headup Games
- Platform(s): Windows
- Release: September 16, 2009
- Genre(s): Action-adventure
- Mode(s): Single-player

Twin Sector is a first-person action-adventure game developed by DNS Development and published by Got Game Entertainment and Headup Games for the PC Windows in 2009. It uses havok for realtime physics.

== Reception ==
Twin Sector received generally unfavourable reviews, resulting in an averaged Metacritic score of 49/100, albeit PC Gamer UK gave it a positive 77/100. Steve Butts from IGN gave this "doubly disappointing" game a score of 4/10 ("Bad"), opining it is "stealing some of the best ideas from other physics-based puzzle games" but "the end result is an exercise in wasted potential" that "fails on nearly every level."
