= Got Game Entertainment =

American video game company

Got Game Entertainment, LLC
- Type: Private
- Industry: Video games
- Founded: Weston, Connecticut, USA
- Headquarters: Weston, Connecticut
- Key people: Howard Horowitz (founder)
- Website: gotgameentertainment.com

Got Game Entertainment, LLC was an American developer and publisher of videogames, based in Weston, Connecticut. Got Game chiefly published adventure games, with ARMA II being the most notable exception. In January 2011, founder Howard Horowitz reorganized Got Game Entertainment.

== Games published ==
- ARMA 2
- Bad Mojo Redux
- Barrow Hill: Curse of the Ancient Circle
- Capri series (the first two games, A Quiet Weekend in Capri and AnaCapri: The Dream, were published by Got Game)
- Nick Delios - Conspiracies
- DarkSpace
- Memento Mori
- Nikopol: Secrets of the Immortals
- Puzzle Scape
- RHEM
- RHEM 2: The Cave
- RHEM 3: The Secret Library
- Scratches
- The Lost Crown: A Ghost-Hunting Adventure
- Tony Tough and the Night of Roasted Moths
- Twin Sector
- WorldShift
