= Serge Belongie =

Professor of Computer Science

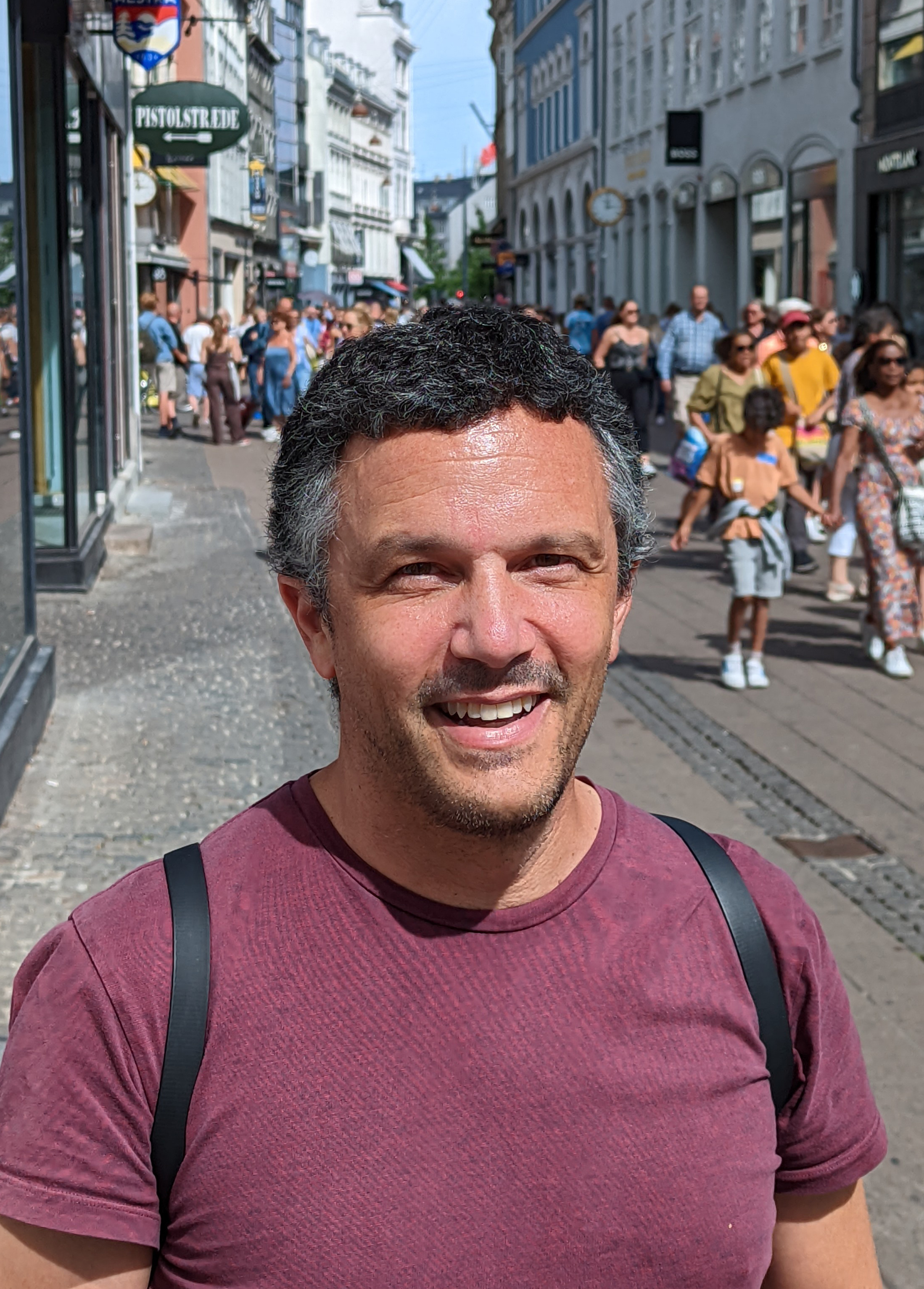
- Belongie in Copenhagen, 2022
- Born: 1974 (age 51–52)
- Education: University of California, Berkeley (PhD)

Serge Belongie (born 1974) is a professor of Computer Science at the University of Copenhagen, where he also serves as the head of the Danish Pioneer Centre for Artificial Intelligence. Previously, he was the Andrew H. and Ann R. Tisch Professor of Computer Science at Cornell Tech, where he also served as Associate Dean. He has also been a member of the Visiting Faculty program at Google. He is known for his contributions to the fields of computer vision and machine learning, specifically object recognition and image segmentation, with his scientific research in these areas cited over 210,000 times according to Google Scholar. Along with Jitendra Malik, Belongie proposed the concept of shape context, a widely used feature descriptor in object recognition. He has co-founded several startups in the areas of computer vision and object recognition.

Belongie also serves as President of the Board for the European Laboratory for Learning and Intelligent Systems (ELLIS), an organization concerned with research and collaboration in the realm of artificial intelligence across Europe.

== Career ==
Belongie received a PhD in electrical engineering and computer science from University of California, Berkeley in 2000, where he was advised by computer scientist Jitendra Malik.

While an undergraduate student at California Institute of Technology, Belongie co-founded Digital Persona, Inc., which created what has been called "the world's first mass-market fingerprint identification device". Digital Persona was acquired by biometric identification company Crossmatch, Inc in 2014. He has also been the co-founder of image recognition startup Anchovi Labs (acquired by Dropbox, Inc. in 2012), and computer vision/video analysis company Orpix, Inc. He is also an Expert in Residence at LDV Capital. Belongie is the creator, along with Pietro Perona, of Visipedia, an image recognition platform that promises to combine computer and human capabilities to allow users to identify and annotate images.

Belongie was a professor of Computer Science at University of California, San Diego between 2001 and 2013, where he was the director of the SO(3) Computer Vision Group. He joined Cornell Tech as a professor in 2014. At Cornell, he was the director of the SE(3) Computer Vision Group, and a member of the Connected Experiences Laboratory. While in San Diego, Belongie was the lead singer/bass player in a band named SO3, which achieved some local success at various clubs and bars.

From 2013 to 2021, Belongie was full professor of computer science at Cornell University.

In 2021, he moved to Denmark to become the director of the Danish Pioneer Centre for Artificial Intelligence, and professor in the Department of Computer Science at the University of Copenhagen.

== Awards ==
The MIT Technology Review named Belongie to their list of Innovators under 35 for 2004. In 2007, Belongie and his co-authors received a Marr Prize Honorable mention for a paper presented at International Conference on Computer Vision. In 2015, he was the recipient of the ICCV Helmholtz Prize, awarded to authors of papers that have made fundamental contributions to the field of computer vision. Belongie also received an NSF Career Award and a Sloan Research Fellowship to support his research. In 2025 Belongie was honored with the American Computer & Robotics Museum Stibitz-Wilson Award, along with Professor Pietro Perona of Caltech, for their work on Visipedia, a landmark project in visual recognition and human-centered artificial intelligence.
