= DarkSpace =

2001 video game

- Developer: Palestar
- Publishers: Palestar, Got Game Entertainment
- Designers: Richard "Faustus" Lyle; Jack "Pantheon" Wallace
- Engine: Medusa Engine
- Platform: Windows
- Release: December 21, 2001
- Genres: MMO, Real-time strategy
- Mode: Multiplayer

DarkSpace is a massively multiplayer real-time strategy computer game developed by PaleStar. Released in December 2001, DarkSpace involves multiplayer spaceship combat between three player-controlled factions.

DarkSpace takes place in a persistent universe, referred to in-game as "The MetaVerse", where players choose from several types of ships and fight for control of planets. It also uses instanced "Scenario" servers, where factions battle for control of a single solar system.

As for the development history of DarkSpace, the game began as a small personal project, survived several deals with multiple publishers, and is run today by a mostly volunteer staff on an open sourced game engine.

== Gameplay ==
Players begin by selecting one of three factions. Two factions are human: the United Galactic Trade Organization (UGTO) with rounded ships, and the Interstellar Cultural Confederation (ICC) with long-range capabilities. Players can also choose the alien K'Luth, who pilot organic ships and are masters of hit and run tactics. DarkSpace also contains several non-player factions to interact with, such as the Machine Intelligence (MI) race, space Pirates, and several other alien entities.

Players then choose a starship. DarkSpace has several types of ships, such as battleships, troop transports, supply vessels, and space stations. Each ship type has different capabilities and plays a unique role in the game. Scout ships, for example, can reveal enemy positions, while heavy cruisers are built for attacking other ships. Players are not limited to a single ship that they "own"; they can return to a shipyard or home gate at any time and select a new ship. Players can also store modified ship layouts in a personal storage "garage".

Teamwork in action: Two K'luth dreadnoughts open fire, supported by a pair of stations.

New players start with the rank of 'midshipman', and are restricted to the smallest ship types. To control larger ships the player must earn higher rankings by accumulating "Prestige Points", which are awarded for various tasks such as damaging enemy ships, bombing and capturing planets, building planetary structures, and repairing the ships of teammates. Most ships not only require a minimum rank but also one or more specific "badges" before they can be piloted. To fly a larger combat ship, for example, a player has to achieve the "Bronze Combat" badge by inflicting 50 points of damage to enemy ships.

DarkSpace emphasizes tactical combat: players are able to control details of their ship's attack and defense maneuvers. It also emphasizes teamwork and organization: since most ships play specialized roles, battles can often be won more easily and prestige earned more quickly if players work together as a team. In the larger scheme, faction control of areas in the MetaVerse requires coordination and communication between large groups of players.

Multiple players: an ICC armada gathers to battle the UGTO.

Although the game takes place in space and uses a 3D graphics engine, gameplay is restricted to a 2D dimensional plane.

=== Server types ===
DarkSpace uses several different types of servers to offer different modes of play. The main game is played out in "MetaVerse" servers, where planets remain in control of a faction until captured. The play area is spread over several star systems and game servers, but all players can travel to the same locations and battle over the same planets.

DarkSpace also offers "Scenario" servers, which contain special plot events or time-limited battles. In scenarios players choose a faction and fight for control of a much smaller area - usually a single solar system. Different game setups and victory conditions may be used for each scenario - for example, factions normally at war may temporarily ally. When the victory conditions are met or when time has expired a winner is declared, prestige is awarded, and the scenario restarts.

== Plot ==
DarkSpace establishes a fictional series of events detailing humanity's future progress into space. In the near future colonies are established on Luna and Mars, which then rebel and claim sovereignty. The United Galactics Trade Organization (UGTO) is formed and does a "complete survey, exploration, and colonization of the Sol system". In 2049 the UGTO sends three ships to explore the Centauri system, where a small outpost is established. Many years of space exploration follow, with humans visiting 11 solar systems and colonizing 10.

Human colonies are now so far from the Sol system that they fall outside of UGTO control. These systems became known as the Farstars. During the First Stellar Conflict the Farstar colonies fight for control of planets and resources but are eventually stopped by a UGTO police force. The UGTO attempt to shut down all independent shipyards, causing planets to rebel and begin the Second Stellar Conflict.

After twenty years of war "the Sol loyal systems once again prevail over the Farstars due to their superior firepower". This is followed by three decades of uneasy peace. Finally, "in 2125 the Free Trade League formally declare[s] the Farstar systems an independent sovereign government henceforth to be known as the Interstellar Cultural Confederation (ICC) and revolution was begun. A series of highly organized surprise attacks drove the UGTO forces from ICC space".

The UGTO and ICC continue to war for many years. In 2266 a UGTO explorer ship disappears in the Sirius system. After investigation by both UGTO and ICC intelligence a joint force arrives to investigate. The taskforce is attacked by an unknown assailant and takes heavy casualties, but the UGTO manages to capture one of the enemy ships. The ship is piloted by an alien species named the K'luth, who reveal themselves to human colonies soon thereafter.

The DarkSpace game begins in the midst of a human civil war, which has been intensified by reports of an alien species aggressively spreading its domain throughout the known universe.

== Development history ==
=== Inception ===
DarkSpace was created by Palestar, an independent development company founded by Richard "Faustus" Lyle. Lyle had the idea for DarkSpace in 1995, when he wanted to make a "massively multiplayer game with real-time elements based in the Master of Orion universe"; Lyle said that "Netrek, Starfleet Command, and Masters of Orion [were] the principle influences on DarkSpace". After getting the game to a playable alpha state in 2000, Palestar teamed up with Blue Byte to publish the game. Blue Byte, attempting to leverage the brand power their Battle Isle series, rechristened the game Battle Isle V: DarkSpace.

Prior to the publishing agreement Palestar had offered closed beta test signups on their website. After Blue Byte became involved they handled the testing arrangements instead. In early 2001, Blue Byte announced a closed beta test of Battle Isle: DarkSpace - testing was to begin in February, and those who had previously signed up through the Palestar website would get first consideration. Remaining beta testers would be selected randomly. The initial group of testers was small, but worked closely with each other and the DarkSpace developers. According to Lyle, beta testing "really help[ed] to work out the bugs and correct gameplay issues".

=== Drop by Ubisoft ===
Soon after testing began Ubisoft announced that they were buying Blue Byte and making it a wholly owned subsidiary. They evaluated the projects Blue Byte was funding and decided that DarkSpace did not fit into the Battle Isle series. Consequently, UbiSoft canceled their publishing contract with Palestar, forcing the small outfit back into independence. Palestar launched a new DarkSpace website in May 2001. After a new back-end infrastructure for the game was written and released (GameCQ), a new public beta test began.

=== Partnership with Playnet ===
The DarkSpace public beta test ran during the summer and fall of 2001. According to Palestar, DarkSpace reached 10,000 registered players in September and 20,000 registered players in November. Since the game was free and reasonably fun, a large number of people drifted through, many of them sticking around throughout the test. Development proceeded at a decent pace, as features were added, bugs fixed, and changes made. Eventually, however, the money provided when Ubisoft canceled the publishing contract would run out, so the game needed to develop a revenue model. In December 2001 Palestar teamed up with Playnet.com to host the game, and DarkSpace moved to a pay to play model, charging $9.99 per calendar month for unlimited access. Players could still access a tutorial and demo mode for free.

=== Retail Publication ===
In July 2002 Palestar signed an agreement with Got Game Entertainment to distribute DarkSpace in retail stores. DarkSpace hit store shelves in December that year.

=== Source code release ===
In June 2009 Palestar released the source code for the DarkSpace game engine, named Medusa. The engine is available under three different licenses. Several days after release the DarkSpace game servers were overwhelmed by downloads and the engine source code had to be temporarily taken down. The source code is currently hosted on GitHub.

=== Present day ===
Since release and the transition from pay-for-play, DarkSpace has had several patches and changes. While the game has always been "under development", the pace of updates has varied. At times changes will be fairly frequent; at others long delays have been known. Palestar's small size (a single part-time programmer since 2002, two from 2008 onwards means that speedy changes are not always possible, or wanted.

Despite these problems DarkSpace continues to develop. Due to limitations mentioned above, volunteer assistance has generally been welcomed in many forms and many of the moderators, game developers, and administrators of the game, forums, and chat rooms are unpaid volunteers.

Darkspace became free-to-play on March 12, 2010 with no restrictions. Players can purchase credits via the online store, or receive a monthly income of credits plus other benefits by subscribing.

== Reception ==
After its release DarkSpace received several positive reviews. Michael Lafferty of GameZone called DarkSpace "a game that looks good, sounds great and plays well", while Brett Todd of GameSpot thought "[n]early every scene could have been clipped from a big-budget movie" and Gamers Hell's Andreas Berntsen said it was "the closest to a perfect online space-strategy game I’ve seen so far". The gaming website Respawn UK named DarkSpace 'Best Space Game of 2002'. However, several reviewers felt that the learning curve was too steep: Lafferty said "when first launched, the tutorial in DarkSpace was somewhat daunting", while Berntsen said "actually mastering the gameplay takes practice, and the initial learning curve can be somewhat steep" and Aaron Daigle from Game Chronicles claimed that "reading the manual and completing the tutorial mode are critical if you want to excel [at] or even just play the game". A common complaint was that DarkSpace suffered from a lack of players. Tim McConnaughy wrote in his GameSpy review that "there are too few players for such a massive strategy element". Berntsen agreed that "there simply aren’t as many players to show what it really can do", and Todd brought attention to lack of players as well.

One of the main goals of DarkSpace was to encourage players to work as a team: in an interview with RespawnUK, Lead developer Richard Lyle stated "we've been very careful about what abilities we give ships, so as to make sure players work together to achieve their goals.". Several reviewers commented on this. Todd noted that "players are intended to work together in their respective factions and complement one another with the specific tasks of their vessels.". Misund felt that "teamplay is absolutely essential", and McConnaughy commented that "players must work together to field a rounded force capable of dealing with threats ... this requires that players work together every step of the way. Darkspace rewards team strategy."

Despite issues with player count and learning curve, several reviews seemed to see potential in DarkSpace. Brett Todd thought that "the groundwork is being laid for DarkSpace to evolve into something special", and Lafferty said "[g]iven some time to grow, DarkSpace will likely be a sleeper hit". Game Chronicles saw a strength where others found weakness, saying "while small in numbers, I think you would be hard pressed to find a cooler group of folks".

In March 2007 DarkSpace announced its 140,000th registered player.

== Technology ==
The login and chat system for DarkSpace uses a back-end system called GameCQ. GameCQ was similar to Blue Byte's portal software, the Blue Byte Game Channel, due to Richard Lyle having written much of the latter. However, as time has progressed GameCQ has developed into a completely different entity.

The GameCQ system deals with all login requests, as well as session information and chat abilities via a process called the MetaServer. When a player connects to one of the available servers, details are passed between the MetaServer and the selected game node so as to authenticate that user.

The game servers themselves are processes which are loaded with a game map. These can range from a single solar system to a collection of them linked by jumpgates. If one map is connected to another and both are located within separate servers, the MetaServer will facilitate the transition and authentication. DarkSpace has two forms of game mode, Scenario and the MetaVerse. Scenario being a single process loaded with a map that contains one solar system, and will rotate to the next based on win conditions. The MetaVerse on the other hand is a collection of multiple processes running multiple maps linked to one another, this can be expanded whenever required based on the player base expanding or shrinking.

The game client and server are a product of the Medusa engine, which is Palestar's own proprietary engine.
