= Tamara Berg =

American computer scientist and computational vision researcher

- Education: University of California, Berkeley (PhD)
- Scientific career
- Workplaces: University of North Carolina at Chapel Hill
- Thesis: Exploiting Words and Pictures (2007)
- Doctoral advisor: David A. Forsyth
- Website: www.tamaraberg.com

Tamara Lee Berg is a tenured associate professor at the University of North Carolina at Chapel Hill and a research scientist manager at Facebook AML/FAIR.

== Education ==
Berg obtained her PhD in computer science from the University of California, Berkeley in 2007 as a member of the Berkeley Computer Vision Group. She was an assistant professor at Stony Brook University from 2008 to 2013 before joining University of North Carolina Chapel Hill in 2013.

== Research ==
Berg's research interests are at the boundary of computer vision and natural language processing. In particular, she focuses on understanding the connections between vision and language, for example, to automatically identify people in news photographs, for generating natural language descriptions for images, or for recognising clothing and style.

== Selected awards and honours ==
- 2019 Mark Everingham Prize
- 2013 Marr Prize at the International Conference on Computer Vision
- 2011 National Science Foundation Career Award

== Personal life ==
Berg is married to fellow computer vision researcher Alexander Berg.
