= Silvio Savarese =

American computer scientist

- Education: University of Naples Federico II; California Institute of Technology (PhD)
- Spouse: Fei-Fei Li
- Children: 2
- Awards: NSF CAREER Award (2011)
- Scientific career
- Fields: Artificial intelligence; Machine learning; Computer vision
- Workplaces: Stanford University; Salesforce
- Thesis: Shape Reconstruction from Shadows and Reflections (2005)
- Doctoral advisor: Pietro Perona

Silvio Savarese is an Italian-American computer scientist focused on artificial intelligence, computer vision, and social robotics. He is a professor of computer science at Stanford University, and executive vice president and chief scientist at Salesforce. In 2024, Savarese was named to Time's list of the 100 Most Influential People in AI, and in 2026, he was appointed to the United Nations Independent International Scientific Panel on AI.

== Early life and education ==
Savarese earned his degree from the University of Naples Federico II in Naples, Italy. He subsequently received his PhD in electrical engineering from the California Institute of Technology in 2005.

Savarese and his father, Gey, developed the computer adventure game A Quiet Weekend in Capri. The game was released in Italy in May 2003 and in North America in 2004. The pair also developed a sequel, AnaCapri: The Dream, released in 2007.

== Career ==
From 2005 to 2008, Savarese was a postdoctoral fellow at the Beckman Institute, University of Illinois at Urbana-Champaign. He was on the faculty of the University of Michigan from 2008 to 2013, first as assistant professor and then associate professor, where he directed the Computer Vision Group and conducted research in 3D scene interpretation, robotics, and machine learning. In 2011, he received an NSF CAREER Award for research into machine interpretation of 3D scenes. That same year, he co-authored Representations and Techniques for 3D Object Recognition & Scene Interpretation with Derek Hoiem.

He then became a tenured professor of computer science at Stanford University, where his research topics included computer vision, machine learning, and robotic perception.

In 2018, Savarese developed JR-2, a socially aware robot capable of reading human intentions through neural networks.

=== Salesforce ===
In 2021, Savarese joined Salesforce as chief scientist. His initial work was in leading development of Einstein GPT, and he now leads development for agentic AI platforms.

Savarese and his team developed CodeGen, an open source large-scale language model for conversational code generation, and Agentforce, an artificial intelligence agent platform for enterprise use.

== Personal life ==
He is married to computer scientist, AI researcher, and Stanford professor Fei-Fei Li. They have two children.
