= Capri (series) =

Computer adventure game

- Developers: Silvio and Gey Savarese
- Publishers: ITA: Oxiana Edizione; NA: Got Game Entertainment; EU: Adventures Planet SRL; EU: S&G Software (TCC)
- Platform: Windows
- Release: A Quiet Weekend in Capri: ITA: May 31, 2003; NA: March 9, 2004; EU: July 2006; AnaCapri: The Dream: EU: June 27, 2007; NA: September 4, 2007; The Capri Connection: EU: July 11, 2014
- Genre: Adventure

A Quiet Weekend in Capri (known in Italy as Un Tranquillo week-end a Capri) is an adventure game in the Capri series by Italian developers Silvio and Gey Savarese, consisting of a Myst-like slideshow of navigable of screens.

A sequel called AnaCapri: The Dream (Italian: I Misteri di Capri) was released in Europe on June 27, 2007 and in North America on September 4, 2007, followed by another sequel, The Capri Connection, released in Europe only on July 11, 2014.

== Gameplay ==
The gameplay is very similar to Myst, in which the player navigates through the landscape by clicking on a series of static screens; 4,500 real photographs of the Mediterranean island of Capri. The player must complete puzzle that involve tasks such as collecting plants, and finding ingredients for a meal.

"The Capri Connection" takes 15–20 hours to complete. Adventure Mode sees the player have to solve a mystery while Walking Mode allow the player to freely explore like a tourist.

== Plot ==
"In A Quiet Weekend in Capri", the player is a tourist visiting Capri in the hopes of having a relaxing weekend, but things start to take a strange turn once you arrive.

"AnaCapri" sees the player return to the northern region of Capri, for an adventure that has a mix of mythology, literature, science fiction, history, and psychology.

In "The Capri Connection", you play as Dr. Nico Fredi, whose mind becomes swapped with that of his alternate universe double Dr. Nick Freuds; the result of Space-Time rip from an experiment-gone-wrong by Dr. Costanzo Gravitiello. The player has to set things back to normal.

== Development ==
Quiet Weekend was developed by a two-man father-and-son team, consisting of Silvio and Gey Savarese. Silvio became interested in games at age 12–13, when he began playing text-based adventures by game designer Scott Adams's company Adventure International, which inspired him to begin plotting out his own adventure game puzzles. His philosophy was to create something that would allow the player to escape from their everyday life.

The genesis of the idea came from taking pictures all around the island of Capri. The pair subsequently began to play around with these images and try to create a larger whole. While Gey focused on the programming, Silvio's task was to work on the narrative. Gey was into science fiction, admiring authors such as Robert Scheckley, Jack Vance, and Isaac Asimov, as well as the concepts of time warps and time machines, so this governed much of the storyline. They also ensured that humour played an important role.

After creating a demo of the work, they had to gain permission from the relevant parties to use all the photos. Due to Gey's lack of software knowledge, he settled for a simple interface that served its purpose and allowed the images to tell the story; they reasoned that if Adams' text-based games could be affecting with text only, their simple technology would suffice. Capri Municipality gave the duo permission to shoot in many iconic locations, and supported the game; for example they created a number of publicity events couple of events to promote the game's release in Italy on May 31, 2003.

"The Capri Connection", the first game in the series made entirely by Gey Savarese, was also the first to utilise locations outside of Capri, including the Italian peninsula.

Quiet Weekend went gold on February 9, 2004, and was scheduled to ship to North American retailers in early March, shipped with a bonus CD soundtrack.

== Critical reception ==
=== A Quiet Weekend in Capri ===
A Quiet Weekend in Capri

Aggregate score
Aggregator	Score
Metacritic	63/100

Review scores
Publication	Score
Adventure Gamers	2.5/5
GameSpot	4.7/10
GameZone	6/10
IGN	6.2/10
PC Gamer (US)	55%

Quiet Weekend received "mixed" reviews according to the review aggregation website Metacritic.

IGN wrote, "It has pretty good sounds and a storyline that can only be described as different - in that it keeps you in the dark about just about everything throughout the game." GameSpot commented that the game's "presentation does it few favors...it all seems very amateurish and cheap". GameZone felt it was a "definite bargain bin purchase".

=== AnaCapri: The Dream ===
AnaCapri: The Dream

Aggregate score
Aggregator	Score
Metacritic	39/100

Review scores
Publication	Score
Adventure Gamers	2.5/5
GameSpot	2.5/10
GameZone	6/10
PC Gamer (US)	15%

AnaCapri: The Dream received "unfavorable" reviews according to Metacritic.

GameSpot compared AnaCapri to the gameplay featured in early 1990s adventure titles, describing it as a "pseudo-nostalgia piece" that isn't fun to play. Game Chronicles reasoned that the use of real-world photography is proof that video games don't require computer-generated imagery to be enjoyable. AnaCapri features 2,700 genuine photograph screens.

=== The Capri Connection ===
GameBoomers had reservations about The Capri Connection, but complimented its ability to illustrate an exotic part of the world not seen in other video games. Adventure Classic Gaming wrote that "soaking up the breathtaking sceneries and exploring the remarkable culture" is an admirable way to experience the region. Meanwhile, Adventure Gamers said the game's "gorgeous" environments were cancelled out by its stereotypical characters and "cockamamie" storyline.
