= RHEM 3: The Secret Library =

2008 video game

- Developer: Knut Müller
- Publishers: Got Game Entertainment; Micro Application
- Engine: Macromedia Director
- Platforms: Windows, Macintosh
- Release: NA: February 28, 2008
- Genre: Graphic adventure
- Mode: Single player

RHEM 3 or RHEM 3: The Secret Library is an adventure game from Knut Müller and Got Game Entertainment.

== Plot ==
The player again arrives into the city of RHEM, with a note from Zetais who studied the artifact in RHEM 2: The Cave. Kales uses the note given by the player to unlock a gate leading to the inner area of RHEM. The game's overall plot is not fully revealed until the player comes back to this area after solving a large number of puzzles.

As stated in the game's title, in order to solve most of the major puzzles, the player must first find and enter a "hidden library", a jumble of rooms containing roll doors and books on shelves. The books themselves contain hints to solve the other puzzles.

The player's goal is to find 10 green crystals scattered throughout RHEM, much like the other two games, in order to unlock the passage to a black crystal.

A new puzzle to access an Easter Egg part of the game resides near the game's end, requiring the input of several scattered, hidden clues. When that's solved, a key to change the route for the player's tram can be retrieved, allowing an extra stop on the way out.

There, 4 concept pictures of the game and a new message from Kales can be found. It takes the input of 4 glyphs to access the message. Kales then states that a special, 5-pointed "Star key" will be needed to access more of RHEM, foreshadowing the series' later events.

== Notable changes and appearances ==
Rhem 3 is the first to have its own official musical soundtrack, compared to RHEM and RHEM 2, which had only ambient weather sounds.

In addition, numerous references to RHEM and RHEM 2 are shown in-game:

- 2 pairs of framed screenshots from the other RHEM games are shown in Kales' office and apartment.
- An iPod-like device residing in Kales' apartment holds messages from him, the ending fly-by from RHEM, and one of the rail-car rides in RHEM 2.
- After solving a certain symbol puzzle, a door can be opened, which leads both to a green crystal, and a staircase leading down. the stairway leads to a previously inaccessible area of RHEM 2 (A cavern near the end of the game with a rotating bridge), although the equipment there is disabled.
- After solving the hidden puzzle, three photo albums from all three RHEM games up to this point can be looked at.
- A new character is introduced: A bald man named Meneandas. He knows about the black crystal's secret and understands that the player will need it.

== Reception ==
Reception

Aggregate score
Aggregator	Score
Metacritic	69/100

Review scores
Publication	Score
Adventure Gamers	3.5/5
GameZone	7.0/10
IGN	6.5/10

RHEM 3 received mixed to positive reviews from critics. On Metacritic, the game received a score of 69/100 based on 8 reviews, indicating "mixed or average reviews".

Sophia Tong of IGN gave the game a score of 6.5/10, praising the game's puzzles but criticizing the environmental and sound design. Steven Hopper of GameZone gave the game a score of 7.0/10, both praising and criticizing its old-school factor in terms of difficulty and gameplay, which can attract "hardcore adventure fans" to the game but turn away casual players at the same time.
