= David Forsyth (computer scientist) =

American computer scientist

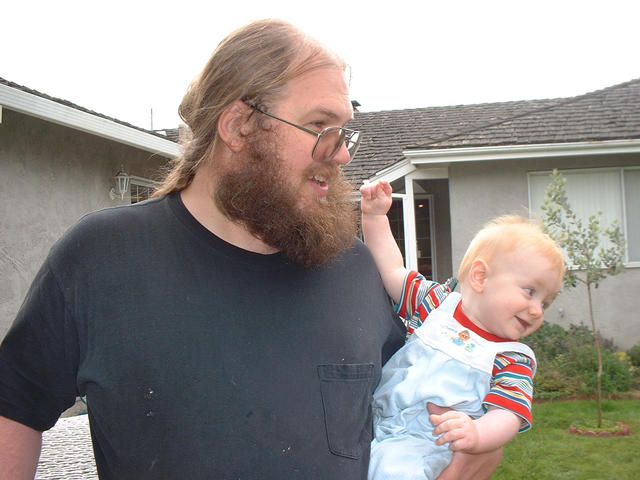
- David Forsyth
- Born: David A. Forsyth; Cape Town, South Africa
- Education: University of Witwatersrand; University of Oxford (DPhil)
- Scientific career
- Workplaces: University of California, Berkeley; University of Illinois at Urbana–Champaign
- Thesis: Colour constancy and its applications in machine vision (1988)
- Doctoral advisor: J. Michael Brady
- Doctoral students: Tamara Berg
- Website: luthuli.cs.uiuc.edu/~daf

David A. Forsyth is a South-African-born American computer scientist and the Fulton Watson Copp Chair in Computer Science the University of Illinois at Urbana–Champaign.

== Education ==
Forsyth holds Bachelor of Science (1984) and Master of Science (1986) degrees in Electrical Engineering from the University of the Witwatersrand, Johannesburg. He was awarded a Doctor of Philosophy degree from the University of Oxford for research supervisor J. Michael Brady in 1989.

== Career and research ==
Forsyth remained at Oxford as a postdoc ("Fellow by Examination") until 1991. He then moved to the University of Iowa and, in 1994, he moved to the University of California, Berkeley, where he became a full professor before joining the University of Illinois at Urbana–Champaign in 2004. In 2002, he co-authored "Computer Vision: A Modern Approach" with UIUC CS Professor Jean Ponce, a leading publication in the field. He has published over 100 papers on computer vision, computer graphics and machine learning. He served as program co-chair for IEEE Computer Vision and Pattern Recognition in 2000, general co-chair for IEEE CVPR 2006, program co-chair for ECCV 2008, program co-chair for IEEE CVPR 2011, general co-chair for IEEE CVPR 2015 and advisor to the program Commiitee for IEEE CVPR 2024. He is a regular member of the program committee of all major international conferences on computer vision. Forsyth served on the NRC Committee on "Protecting Kids from Pornography and other Inappropriate Material on the Internet", which sat for three years and produced a widely praised study. He has received best paper awards at the International Conference on Computer Vision and at the European Conference on Computer Vision.

Forsyth's research interest also include graphics and machine learning; he served as a committee member of ICML 2008.

== Awards and honors ==
In 2013, he was elected a Fellow of the Association for Computing Machinery.
