= RHEM 2: The Cave =

2005 video game

- Developer: Knut Müller
- Publishers: Got Game Entertainment and Virtual Programming
- Engine: Macromedia Director
- Platforms: Windows, Mac OS, Mac OS X
- Release: Mac; October 25, 2005; Windows; November 2, 2005
- Genre: Adventure game
- Mode: Single-player

RHEM 2 is an adventure game from Knut Müller and Got Game Entertainment and the sequel to RHEM. It is distributed as a Macromedia Director file.

Like Myst and Riven, Rhem 2 is a node-based first-person adventure game. The player explores a series of caverns in search of a certain artifact. The puzzles involve spatial reasoning, operating machinery, and logic.

There is little plot or character interaction in Rhem 2; the emphasis lies solely on its puzzles. Many puzzles require the player to determine his location with respect to adjacent areas or objects in order to solve it. For instance, in order to solve a puzzle it may be necessary to trace a cable through a wall between two rooms, but the path from one room to the other is circuitous.

== Plot ==
The game opens with the player's arrival in a series of caves underneath the city of Rhem. A video greeting from another explorer, Kales, explains that the player must find an artifact hidden somewhere within the caverns, take a photograph of it, and bring the photo to Kales's brother Zetais. The player must find the artifact in order to unlock the train and leave Rhem.

== Release ==
RHEM 2: The Cave was rereleased on October 2, 2018, under a title Rhem II SE: The Cave.

== Reception ==
Reception

Aggregate score
Aggregator	Score
Metacritic	75/100

Review scores
Publication	Score
Adventure Gamers	2/5
GameZone	7.5/10

RHEM 2 received "generally favorable reviews" according to the review aggregation website Metacritic. Anise Hollingshead of GameZone praised the quantity and quality of the game's puzzles but criticized the graphics and voice acting.
