= Fei-Fei Li =

American computer scientist (born 1976)

- 李飞飞
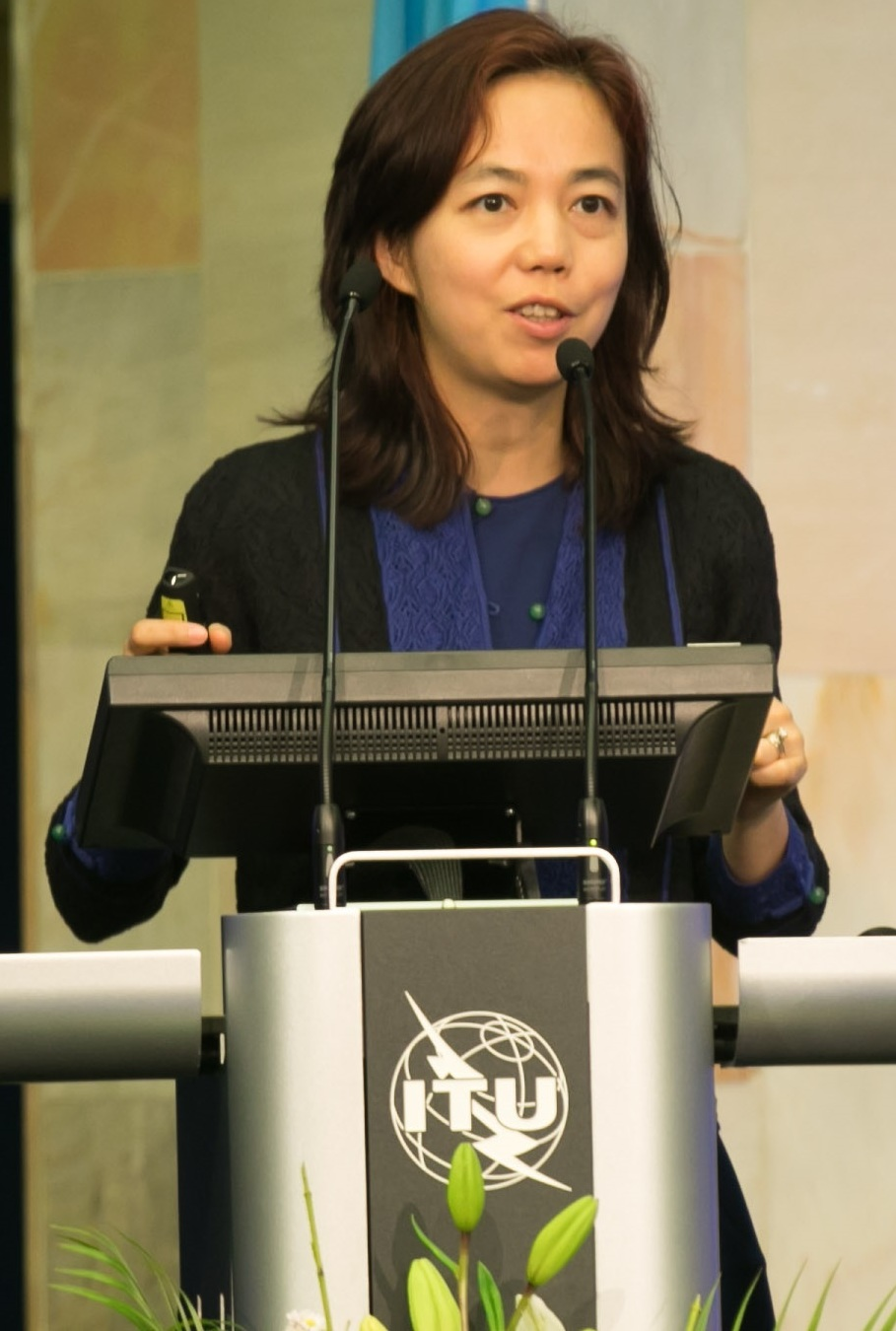
- Li in 2017
- Born: July 3, 1976 (age 50); Beijing, China
- Education: Princeton University (BA); California Institute of Technology (MS, PhD)
- Known for: Computer vision; Machine learning; Artificial intelligence; AI in healthcare; Cognitive neuroscience; ImageNet
- Spouse: Silvio Savarese
- Children: 2
- Awards: Elected to National Academy of Engineering (2020); National Academy of Medicine (2020); American Academy of Arts and Sciences (2021); ACM Fellow (2018); VinFuture Prize (2024); Queen Elizabeth Prize for Engineering (2025)
- Scientific career
- Fields: Electrical engineering
- Workplaces: Stanford University; Google; AMD
- Thesis: Visual Recognition: Computational Models and Human Psychophysics (2005)
- Doctoral advisor: Pietro Perona; Christof Koch
- Doctoral students: Olga Russakovsky; Timnit Gebru; Andrej Karpathy
- Website: profiles.stanford.edu/fei-fei-li

Fei-Fei Li (Chinese: 李飞飞; pinyin: Lǐ Fēifēi; born July 3, 1976) is a Chinese-born American computer scientist best known for establishing ImageNet, the dataset that enabled rapid advances in computer vision in the 2010s. She is a professor of computer science at Stanford University, with research expertise in artificial intelligence, machine learning, deep learning, computer vision, and cognitive neuroscience. Li has been called the "godmother of AI".

Li is a co-director of the Stanford Institute for Human-Centered Artificial Intelligence and a co-director of the Stanford Vision and Learning Lab, and served as Chief Scientist of AI/ML at Google Cloud and the director of the Stanford Artificial Intelligence Laboratory from 2013 to 2018. In 2017, she co-founded AI4ALL, a nonprofit organization working to increase diversity in the field of artificial intelligence. In 2023, Li was named one of the Time 100 AI Most Influential People.

Li received the Intel Lifetime Achievements Innovation Award in 2017 for her contributions to artificial intelligence, and was elected member of the National Academy of Engineering, the National Academy of Medicine in 2020 and the American Academy of Arts and Sciences in 2021. In 2025, she was named as one of the "Architects of AI" for Time's Person of the Year. On August 3, 2023, Li was appointed to the United Nations Scientific Advisory Board, established by Secretary-General Antonio Guterres. In 2024, Li was included on the Gold House's most influential Asian A100 list.

In 2024, she raised $230 million for World Labs, a startup which she and three colleagues founded to develop a "spatial intelligence" AI technology that can understand how the three-dimensional physical world works. In 2026, AMD acquired World Labs for $8.2 billion, with Li becoming AMD's chief scientist.

== Early life and education ==
Li was born in Beijing, China, in 1976 and grew up in Chengdu, Sichuan. She studied at Sichuan Chengdu No.7 High School. When she was 12, her father immigrated to Parsippany, New Jersey. When she was 16, Li and her mother joined him in the United States. She arrived unable to speak English. While attending Parsippany High School, Li worked weekends at her family's dry-cleaning shop. She graduated from Parsippany High School in 1995. She was inducted into the hall of fame at Parsippany High School in 2017.

Li pursued undergraduate study at Princeton University, where she received a Bachelor of Arts with a major in physics in 1999. Li completed her senior thesis, Auditory binaural correlogram difference: a new computational model for Huggins dichotic pitch, under the supervision of Bradley Dickinson, professor of electrical engineering. During her years at Princeton, Li returned home most weekends to help run her family's dry cleaning business and worked as a dishwasher to supplement the family income.

Li pursued graduate study at the California Institute of Technology, where she received a Master of Science in electrical engineering in 2001 and a Doctor of Philosophy in electrical engineering in 2005. Li completed her dissertation, Visual Recognition: Computational Models and Human Psychophysics, under the primary supervision of Pietro Perona and secondary supervision of Christof Koch. Her graduate studies were supported by the National Science Foundation Graduate Research Fellowship and The Paul & Daisy Soros Fellowships for New Americans.

== Career and research ==
From 2005 to 2006, Li was an assistant professor in the Electrical and Computer Engineering Department at the University of Illinois Urbana-Champaign, and from 2007 to 2009, she was an assistant professor in the Computer Science Department at Princeton University. She joined Stanford in 2009 as an assistant professor, and was promoted to associate professor with tenure in 2012, and then full professor in 2018. At Stanford, Li served as the director of Stanford Artificial Intelligence Lab (SAIL) from 2013 to 2018. Her research has focused on computer vision, deep learning, and cognitive neuroscience, with over 300 peer-reviewed publications. She became the founding co-director of Stanford's University-level initiative - the Human-Centered AI Institute, along with co-director Dr. John Etchemendy, former provost of Stanford University. The institute, established in 2009, seeks to direct AI technology policy toward improving the human condition.

While at Princeton in 2007, Li led the development of ImageNet, a massive visual database designed to advance object recognition in AI. The project involved labeling over 14 million images using Amazon Mechanical Turk and inspired the ImageNet Large Scale Visual Recognition Challenge (ILSVRC), which catalyzed progress in deep learning and led to dramatic improvements in image classification performance. The database addressed a key bottleneck in computer vision: the lack of large, annotated datasets for training machine learning models. Today, ImageNet is credited as a cornerstone innovation that underpins advancements in autonomous vehicles, facial recognition, and medical imaging.

On her sabbatical from Stanford University from January 2017 to fall of 2018, Li joined Google Cloud as its Chief Scientist of AI/ML and Vice President. At Google, her team focused on democratizing AI technology and lowering the barrier for entrance to businesses and developers, including the developments of products like AutoML.

In September 2017, Google secured a contract from the Department of Defense called Project Maven, which aimed to use AI techniques to interpret images captured by drone cameras. Google told employees who protested the company's work on Project Maven that their role was "specifically scoped to be for non-offensive purposes". In June 2018, Google told employees it would not seek renewal of the contract. In internal emails which were later leaked to reporters, Li expressed enthusiasm for the Google Cloud role in Project Maven, but warned against mentioning its AI component, saying that military AI is linked in the public mind with the danger of autonomous weapons. Asked about those leaked emails, Li told The New York Times, "I believe in human-centered AI to benefit people in positive and benevolent ways. It is deeply against my principles to work on any project that I think is to weaponize AI."

In the fall of 2018, Li left Google and returned to Stanford University to continue her professorship.

In 2023, Li co-led the launch of the RAISE-Health (Responsible AI for Safe and Equitable Health) initiative at Stanford University in collaboration with Stanford medicine. The initiative aims to develop frameworks for the responsible use of artificial intelligence in healthcare, including clinical care, biomedical research, and patient safety.

According to her Stanford profile, she was on partial academic leave from January 2024 through the end of 2025 to focus on entrepreneurial ventures.

In 2024, Li said there was a disparity between private-sector investment in AI and support for academic and government research, and called for greater public funding for scientific uses of the technology and for studying its risks.

Li is also known for her non-profit work as the co-founder and chairperson of nonprofit organization AI4ALL, whose mission is to educate the next generation of AI technologists, thinkers and leaders by promoting diversity and inclusion through human-centered AI principles. The program was created in collaboration with Melinda French Gates and Jensen Huang.

Prior to establishing AI4ALL in 2017, Li and her former student Olga Russakovsky, currently an assistant professor in Princeton University, co-founded and co-directed the precursor program at Stanford called SAILORS (Stanford AI Lab OutReach Summers). SAILORS was an annual summer camp at Stanford dedicated to 9th grade high school girls in AI education and research, established in 2015 till it changed its name to AI4ALL @Stanford in 2017. In 2018, AI4ALL has successfully launched five more summer programs in addition to Stanford, including Princeton University, Carnegie Mellon University, Boston University, University of California Berkeley, and Canada's Simon Fraser University.

We are at a turning point. AI's influence continues to grow, but representation and inclusion of a diversity of researchers in the field does not. It's critical that we seize this moment to create structures that will support long-term, positive changes. This won't happen via a single mechanism or quick fix. It starts with early education and extends to the existing structures of power within academia, work cultures among current AI researchers, and gatekeeping functions of research publishing, to name a few levers of change.

— Fei-Fei Li and Tess Posner, Nature

Li has been described as a "researcher bringing humanity to AI".

Li was elected as a member of the American Academy of Arts and Sciences in 2021, the National Academy of Engineering in 2020, and the National Academy of Medicine in 2020.

In a November 2023 interview with The Guardian, Li said that while she would not refer to herself as the "godmother of AI", she accepts the description as a way to recognize women's contributions to the field.

In February 2025, at the Artificial Intelligence Action Summit in Paris, Li stated that AI governance should be based on science rather than "science fiction", and urged a more scientific approach to assessing AI capabilities and limitations.

=== World Labs ===
World Labs
- Type: Private
- Industry: Artificial intelligence
- Founded: 2024
- Founders: Fei-Fei Li, Justin Johnson, Christoph Lassner, Ben Mildenhall
- Defunct: November 16, 2026; 4 days ago
- Fate: Acquired by AMD
- Headquarters: United States
- Key people: Fei-Fei Li (CEO)
- Products: Immersive 3D imaging (Marble, Atlas)
- Website: www.worldlabs.ai

In 2024, while on partial leave from Stanford, Li, along with Justin Johnson, Christoph Lassner, and Ben Mildenhall, founded World Labs, a startup focused on developing artificial intelligence with "spatial intelligence", a concept involving an AI system's ability to reason about and act within three-dimensional environments. According to Reuters, the company raised seed funding from investors. The Financial Times later reported that the company had raised two rounds of funding and was valued at more than $1 billion. The technology aims to integrate visual perception with action, such as enabling robotic systems to perform everyday tasks based on verbal instructions. Li described the effort as aiming for more human-like reasoning and interaction with the physical world.

In 2025 the company introduced Marble, a system that can generate navigable 3D environments from text, images, or video prompts. In September 2026, it announced a successor system, Atlas.

In early 2026 World Labs raised an additional $1 billion in funding from investors including AMD, Nvidia, Autodesk, Emerson Collective, and Fidelity Management & Research.

On September 28, 2026, AMD announced it was acquiring World Labs for $8.2 billion, with Li joining AMD as the company's chief scientist, reporting directly to CEO Lisa Su. The deal was completed in November.

=== Research ===
Li works on artificial intelligence, machine learning, computer vision, cognitive neuroscience, and computational neuroscience. She has published more than 300 peer-reviewed research papers. Her work appears in computer science and neuroscience journals including Nature, Proceedings of the National Academy of Sciences, Journal of Neuroscience, Conference on Computer Vision and Pattern Recognition, International Conference on Computer Vision, Conference on Neural Information Processing Systems, European Conference on Computer Vision, International Journal of Computer Vision, and IEEE Transactions on Pattern Analysis and Machine Intelligence. Among her best-known work is the ImageNet project, which has revolutionized the field of large-scale visual recognition.

In 2007, while at Princeton, Li began developing ImageNet with the goal of building a large-scale visual dataset inspired by an estimate from cognitive psychologist Irving Biederman that humans recognize approximately 30,000 object categories. The project faced early skepticism from colleagues who considered the scale impractical, but Li continued development, ultimately using Amazon Mechanical Turk to help label over 14 million images across 22,000 categories.

Li has led the team of students and collaborators to organize the international competition on ImageNet recognition tasks called ImageNet Large-Scale Visual Recognition Challenge (ILSVRC) between 2010 and 2017 in the academic community.

Li's research in computer vision contributed to a line of work called Natural Scene Understanding, or later, story-telling of images. She was recognized for her work in this area by the International Association for Pattern Recognition in 2016. She delivered a talk on the main stage of TED in Vancouver in 2015, and has since then been viewed more than 2 million times.

In recent years, Fei-Fei Li's research work expanded to artificial intelligence in healthcare, collaborating closely with Stanford University School of Medicine professor Arnold Milstein. She has also worked on improving bias in image recognition, for instance by removing concepts with low imageability from ImageNet.

=== Teaching ===
She teaches the Stanford course CS231n on "Deep Learning for Computer Vision", whose 2015 version was previously online at Coursera. She has also taught CS131, an introductory class on computer vision.

=== Board roles ===
In May 2020, Li joined the board of directors of Twitter as an independent director. On October 27, 2022, following Elon Musk's purchase of the company, Li and eight others were removed from Twitter's nine-member board of directors, leaving Musk as the sole director.

On August 3, 2023, Li Fei Fei was announced as a member of the United Nations (UN) Scientific Advisory Board, established by Secretary-General António Guterres. She is among seven external scientists on this board, which also includes the Chief Scientists from various UN agencies, the UN University Rector, and the Secretary-General's Envoy on Technology. The board's primary aim is to offer independent perspectives on emerging trends that intersect science, technology, ethics, governance, and sustainable development. It is designed to act as a central hub for a network of scientific networks, enhancing the integration of scientific insights into UN decision-making processes.

== Selected honors and awards ==
Li has received numerous accolades, including induction into the National Academy of Engineering (2020), the National Academy of Medicine (2020), and the American Academy of Arts and Sciences (2021). In 2025, she was awarded the Queen Elizabeth Prize for Engineering, recognizing her role in advancing deep learning.

- 1999: The Paul & Daisy Soros Fellowships for New Americans
- 2006: Microsoft Research New Faculty Fellowship
- 2009: NSF CAREER Award
- 2010: Best Paper Honorable Mention, IEEE Conference on Computer Vision and Pattern Recognition (CVPR)
- 2011: Fellow, Alfred P. Sloan Fellowship
- 2015: One of the Leading Global Thinkers of 2015, Foreign Policy
- 2016: IEEE PAMI Mark Everingham Prize
- 2016: J.K. Aggarwal Prize, International Association for Pattern Recognition (IAPR)
- 2016: One of the 40 "The great immigrants", Carnegie Foundation
- 2017: WITI@UC Athena Award for Academic Leadership, University of California
- 2017: One of Seven Women in Technology honorees, Elle Magazine
- 2018: Elected as ACM Fellow for "contributions in building large knowledge bases for machine learning and visual understanding"
- 2018: "America's Top 50 Women In Tech" by Forbes
- 2018: U.S. Congressional hearing by Subcommittee on Research and Technology & Subcommittee on Energy
- 2019: Technical Leadership Abie Award Winner, AnitaB.org
- 2019: BBC 100 Women
- 2020: Elected member of the National Academy of Engineering
- 2020: Elected member of the National Academy of Medicine
- 2020: Distinguished Alumni Award Winner of California Institute of Technology
- 2020: Member of the Council on Foreign Relations (CFR)
- 2021: Elected member of the American Academy of Arts and Sciences
- 2022: Thomas S. Huang Memorial Prize, IEEE PAMI
- 2023: Intel Lifetime Achievements Innovation Award
- 2023: Time AI100
- 2024: Woodrow Wilson Award, Princeton
- 2024: VinFuture Prize's grand prize
- 2025: Queen Elizabeth Prize for Engineering jointly with Yoshua Bengio, Bill Dally, Geoffrey E. Hinton, John Hopfield, Jen-Hsun Huang and Yann LeCun.
- 2025: Honorary Doctor of Engineering and Technology degree, Yale University.
- 2025: Included in Time's Person of the Year issue.

== Personal life ==
Li is married to Stanford professor Silvio Savarese. They have a son and a daughter.

== Publications ==
=== Books ===
- Ford, Martin (2018). "Fei-Fei Li". Architects of Intelligence: The Truth About AI from the People Building It. Birmingham, UK: Packt Publishing. pp. 145–162. ISBN 978-1-78913-126-0. OCLC 1083340727. Interview of Li by Ford.
- Li, Fei Fei (2023). The Worlds I See: Curiosity, Exploration, and Discovery at the Dawn of AI. New York, NY: Moment of Lift Books, Flatiron Books. ISBN 978-1-250-89794-7. OCLC 1404458360.

=== Selected articles ===
- Li, Fei Fei; VanRullen, Rufin; Koch, Christof; Perona, Pietro (July 9, 2002). "Rapid natural scene categorization in the near absence of attention". Proceedings of the National Academy of Sciences. 99 (14): 9596–9601. Bibcode:2002PNAS...99.9596L. doi:10.1073/pnas.092277599. ISSN 0027-8424. PMC 123186. PMID 12077298.
- Li Fe-Fei; Fergus; Perona (2003). Proceedings Ninth IEEE International Conference on Computer Vision (PDF). IEEE. doi:10.1109/iccv.2003.1238476.
- Li Fei-Fei; Fergus, R.; Perona, P. (2004). "Learning Generative Visual Models from Few Training Examples: An Incremental Bayesian Approach Tested on 101 Object Categories". 2004 Conference on Computer Vision and Pattern Recognition Workshop. IEEE. p. 178. doi:10.1109/CVPR.2004.383.
- Fei-Fei Li; Perona, P. (2005). A Bayesian Hierarchical Model for Learning Natural Scene Categories (PDF). Vol. 2. IEEE. doi:10.1109/CVPR.2005.16. ISBN 978-0-7695-2372-9.
- Li Fei-Fei; Fergus, R.; Perona, P. (2006). "One-shot learning of object categories". IEEE Transactions on Pattern Analysis and Machine Intelligence. 28 (4): 594–611. Bibcode:2006ITPAM..28..594F. doi:10.1109/TPAMI.2006.79. ISSN 0162-8828. PMID 16566508. Presented as slides.
- Fei-Fei, Li; Iyer, Asha; Koch, Christof; Perona, Pietro (January 31, 2007). "What do we perceive in a glance of a real-world scene?". Journal of Vision. 7 (1): 10. doi:10.1167/7.1.10. ISSN 1534-7362. PMID 17461678.

== See also ==
- List of open-source artificial intelligence software
- List of roboticists
