= Headup Games =

German video game publisher

Headup GmbH
- Type: Subsidiary
- Industry: Video games
- Founded: January 2009; 17 years ago
- Founder: Dieter Schoeller
- Headquarters: Düren, Germany
- Area served: Worldwide
- Key people: Dieter Schoeller; (managing director); Marcel Aldrup; (executive producer); Mark Aldrup; (CTO)
- Number of employees: 14 (2021)
- Parent: Thunderful Group (2021–2024); Microcuts Holding (2024–present)
- Website: headupgames.com

Headup GmbH (also known as Headup Games) is a German video game publisher based in Düren. The company was founded in January 2009 by Dieter Schoeller, who serves as its managing director and owns the company under Microcuts Holding. The company is best known for publishing the Bridge Constructor series of games developed by ClockStone.

== History ==
Headup Games was founded in January 2009 by Dieter Schoeller, who became its managing director. Operations were formally launched in Düren in April 2009, with Headup also employing executive producer Marcel Aldrup and executive PR & marketing manager Michael Zolna. The first game published by Headup was Twin Sector, an action-adventure game developed by Bremen-based studio DNS Development and released in September 2009. Subsequently, the company signed an agreement with NBG Multimedia that would allow NBG to distribute Headup's games in Germany, Austria and Switzerland. In October, Headup joined G.A.M.E., a German association for the video game industry. By January 2013, Headup employed six people, of which Zolna left the company in early April, being succeeded by Skander Essadi. By June 2014, Headup employed Schoeller, Aldrup and Aldrup's brother Mark as full-time employees, three trainees and two interns.

Headup was acquired by the Thunderful Group in February 2021 for up to €11 million, with the acquisition completed in March 2021.

On 28 March 2024, Thunderful Group agreed to sell Headup Games to Microcuts Holding (a holding company owned by Dieter Schoeller) for €500,000. The sale will include Headup's back catalogue of approximately 80 titles and a pipeline of five games currently in development. As part of the agreement, Thunderful will receive a revenue share of up to €300,000 from a future unannounced title. The finalization of the deal is subject to shareholder approval, rewriting of three IP-related contracts, and the transfer of Studio Fizbin to Thunderful. Studio Fizbin, another German developer, was acquired by Thunderful through Headup in 2023. The sale of Headup is part of Thunderful's restructuring program, which includes a 20% reduction in staff announced in January.

On 21 August 2024, Headup spun off their in-house development team into a separate independent studio named Goon Squad; both remain subsidiaries of Microcuts Holding.

In March 2026, Reforged Studios acquired Headup, with Dieter Schoeller taking an executive role at the parent.

== Accolades ==
Deutscher Entwicklerpreis – "Best Publisher" (2012, 2013, 2017)
