= Tess Posner =

American social entrepreneur & AI diversity advocate

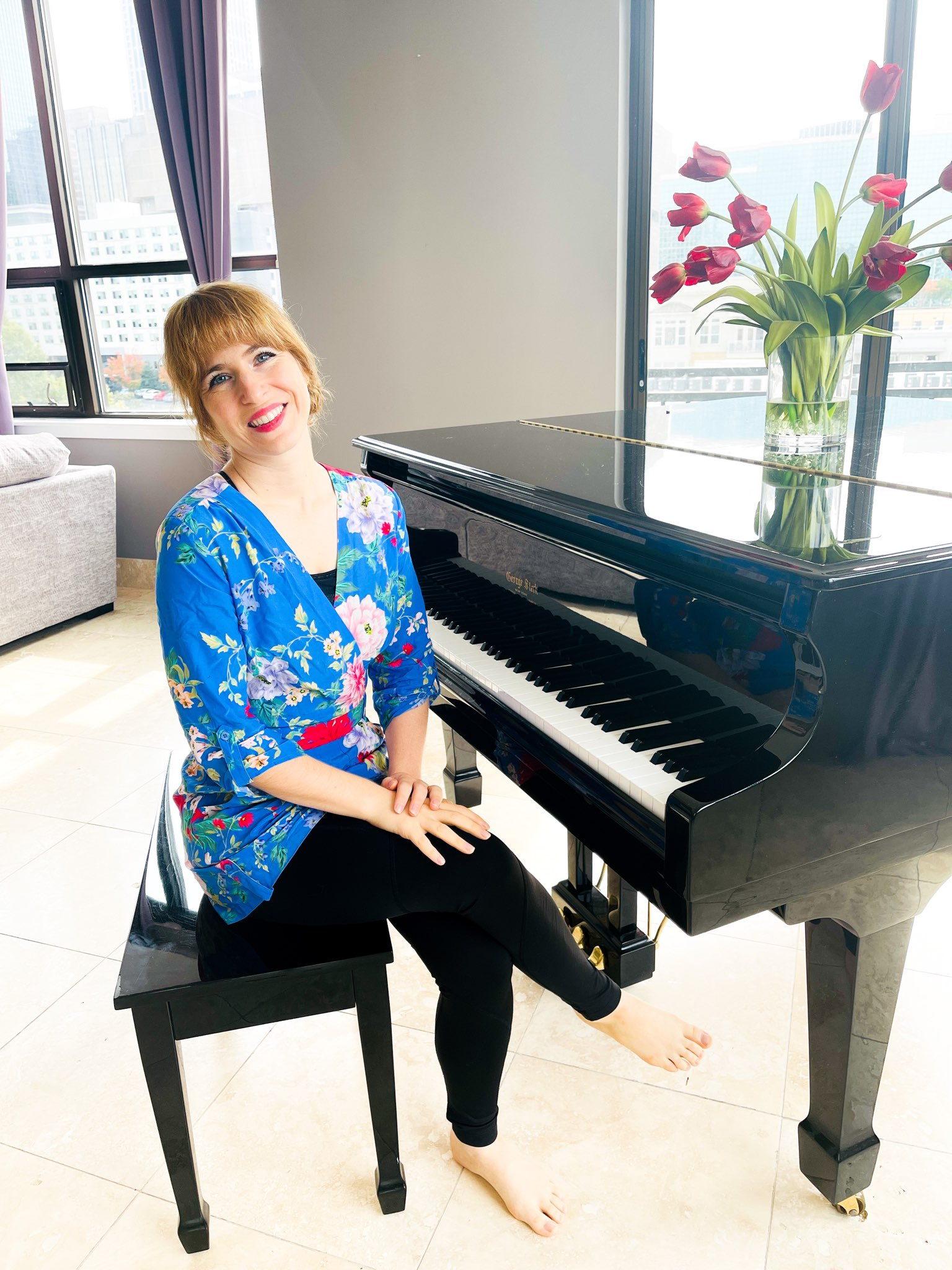
- Known for: Artificial Intelligence; AI Ethics; Diversity in Technology

Academic background
- Education: Columbia University (M.A.); Saint John's College (B.A.)

Academic work
- Institutions: AI4ALL

Tess Posner is an American social entrepreneur and musician known for her work in artificial intelligence advocacy and ethics, focusing on increasing equity and inclusion in technology.

Posner has headed multiple initiatives to promote diversity in technology before being hired as the CEO of the non-profit organization AI4ALL, a position from which she stepped down in 2021 to concentrate on her music career. Her work has earned recognition including her selection as one of the 100 Brilliant Women in AI Ethics in 2020.

== Early years and education ==
Posner grew up near Boston, Massachusetts. In high school, she traveled to El Salvador to build houses with Habitat for Humanity following an earthquake. Posner holds a Bachelor's degree in Philosophy and Mathematics from Saint John's College and a Master's degree from Columbia University in Social Enterprise Administration.

== Career ==
=== Social entrepreneurship ===
Early in her career, Posner built and ran Samsa School, a non-profit organization providing low-income people worldwide with tools and education to find work in the digital economy. Then, she became the managing director of TechHire at Opportunity@Work, a White House initiative that sought to increase diversity in the technology industry. In 2016, Posner was selected as a fellow at the Institute for the Future.

Posner then joined non-profit organization AI4ALL as their CEO and executive director. AI4ALL provides AI education and mentorship particularly towards historically underrepresented talent. In the years she served as CEO, AI4ALL saw over 15,000 young people participate in the organization's AI education and mentorship programs. Posner has spoken at SXSW, Grace Hopper Celebration, Nvidia GPU Technology Conference, and further conferences about artificial intelligence and technology diversity and outreach.

She is listed as a coauthor in Vint Cerf and David Nordfors's 2018 book The People Centered Economy: The New Ecosystem for Work.

In an online statement published in October 2021, Posner announced that she would step out of the role as CEO of AI4ALL into an advisory role to pursue her music career full-time. Emily Reid took over her role at the start of 2022 as interim CEO.

=== Music ===
Posner is also an alt-pop music artist. She released her first EP in 2018 and released new singles in 2020.

== Selected awards and recognition ==
- 2019 – VentureBeat Women in AI Award: Responsibility and Ethics Winner
- 2019 – Alconics Awards AI Innovator of the Year Finalist
- 2020 – 100 Brilliant Women in AI Ethics Hall of Fame Honoree
