= RHEM 4: The Golden Fragments =

2010 video game

- Developer: Knut Müller
- Publisher: Lace Mamba Global (Note: Retail version released in North America by WHA Entertainment.)
- Engine: Macromedia Director
- Platforms: Windows, Mac OS X
- Release: July 30, 2010
- Genre: Graphic adventure
- Mode: Single player

RHEM 4: The Golden Fragments is a 2010 adventure game released for Windows and Mac OS X by Knut Müller.

== Plot ==
The game begins with Kales giving you the note and the black crystal explaining the reason why he needs you to come back to RHEM. After you arrive to RHEM by railcar, Kales informs you on a projector the task that you need to fulfill, in this case, gather nine golden fragments.

== Gameplay ==
The game objective is to collect all nine golden fragments to safely return to the outside world.

== Release ==
RHEM 4: The Golden Fragments was released digitally by Lace Mamba Global on July 30, 2010. It received a retail release for Windows and Mac OS X in Europe by Lace Mamba on September 24, 2010, and in North America by WHA Entertainment on December 3, 2010.

The game was re-released on February 3, 2016, under the title Rhem IV SE: The Golden Fragments by Runesoft via Steam. On May 6, 2016, RuneSoft published the game.

== Reception ==
Reception

Review score
Publication	Score
Adventure Gamers	3.5/5

RHEM 4 received 7.5 from Gamers Daily News and 58% from Electronic Theatre, the latter of which noted the limited nature of the game's scope.
