= Philip Torr =

British computer scientist

Philip Torr FRS FREng
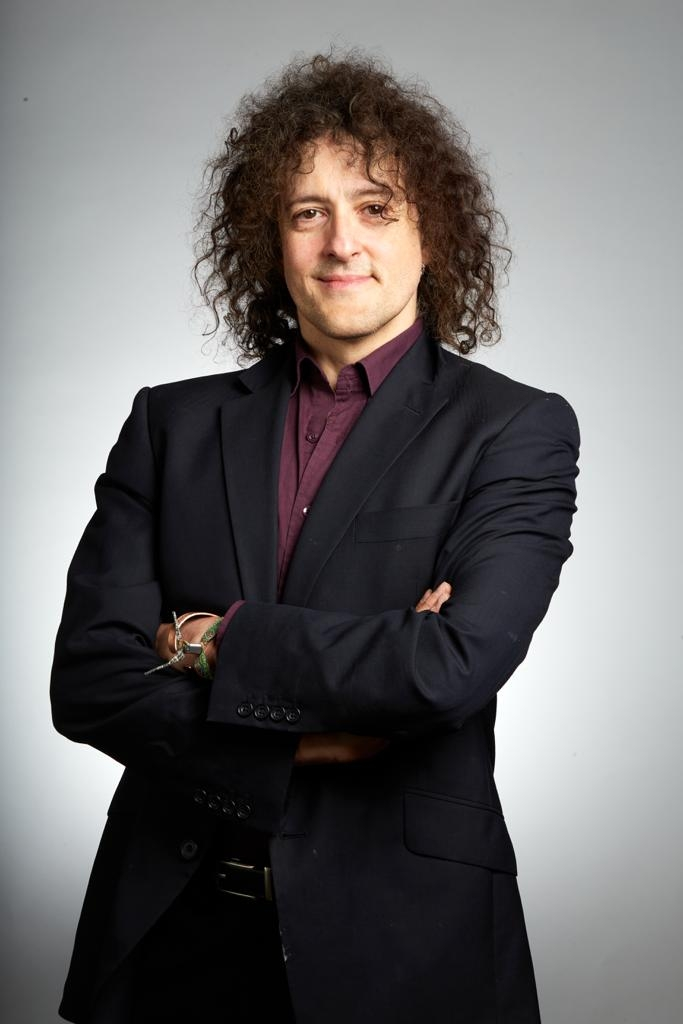
- Philip Torr in 2024
- Born: Philip Hilaire Sean Torr; April 1966 (age 60)
- Education: Manchester Grammar School
- Alma mater: University of Southampton (BSc); University of Oxford (DPhil)
- Known for: Computer Vision
- Awards: Royal Society Wolfson Fellowship
- Scientific career
- Fields: Computer Vision; AI safety AI scientist
- Workplaces: University of Oxford; Microsoft Research; Oxford Brookes University
- Thesis: Outlier Detection and Motion Segmentation (1995)
- Doctoral advisor: David W. Murray
- Doctoral students: Pushmeet Kohli
- Website: torrvision.com

Philip Hilaire Sean Torr (born 1966) is a British scientist and a professor at the University of Oxford. His research interests are in machine learning and computer vision and he is a fellow of St Catherine's College, Oxford.

== Education ==
Torr was privately educated at Manchester Grammar School from 1977 to 1983. He graduated with a first class degree in pure mathematics from the University of Southampton in 1987, and then completed a Doctor of Philosophy (DPhil) degree at the University of Oxford where his research was supervised by David W. Murray.

== Career and research ==
After his DPhil, Torr worked for another three years at Oxford as a postdoctoral research fellow with Andrew Zisserman in the visual geometry group.

Torr left Oxford to work for six years as a research scientist for Microsoft Research, first in Redmond, Washington, US, in the Vision Technology Group, then in Cambridge, UK, founding the vision side of the Machine Learning and Perception Group. He was subsequently appointed a Professor in Computer Vision and Machine Learning at Oxford Brookes University. During this time he worked closely with Sony, his group is credited for computer vision on the title of the Wonderbook Book of Spells, which sold over 660,000 units. Torr also worked closely with Oxford-based company Vicon on markerless motion capture, this work was awarded best knowledge transfer partnership (KTP) of the year in 2009. In 2013, Torr returned to University of Oxford as a full professor where he established the Torr Vision group.

In 2016 he founded Oxsight a social enterprise to help people with visual impairment use computer vision techniques to enhance their life. In 2019 he founded AIstetic a company to do 3D reconstruction. Torr has served as chief scientific advisor for Five AI from their formation in 2016 through their journey to acquisition in 2022 by Bosch Group. Torr became a Chief Scientific Advisor for DreamTech, Exient established by ex-members of the Torr Vision Group.

In 2024, he joined CAMEL-AI as an advisor, contributing to the first large language model (LLM) multi-agent framework and an open-source community dedicated to discovering the scaling law of agents.

Torr has served as chair for conferences in his field including ECCV 2008, ICCV 2013, CVPR 2019 and ICCV 2029. He was also invited as a speaker of Starmus Festival in 2024.

More recently, Torr's group has branched out from computer vision into the fields of AI safety and AI scientist research. Torr is a fellow of the Future of Life Institute, as well as distinguished research fellow at the Institute for Ethics in AI at Oxford. He is interested in ensuring that its benefits are distributed equally to all of society.

=== Awards and honours ===
Torr won several awards including:

- Turing AI world leading researcher fellow in 2021
- Elected a Fellow of the Royal Society (FRS) 2021
- Elected a Fellow of the Royal Academy of Engineering (FREng) in 2019
- Best Paper Award at European Conference on Computer Vision (ECCV) 2010 for the paper Graph Cut based Inference with Co-occurrence Statistics.
- Best Science Paper at the British Machine Vision Conference (BMVC) 2010 for the paper Joint Optimisation for Object Class Segmentation and Dense Stereo Reconstruction.
- Best Paper Award at Conference on Computer Vision and Pattern Recognition (CVPR) 2008 for the paper Global Stereo Reconstruction under Second Order Smoothness Priors
- Honorary mention at the Conference on Neural Information Processing Systems (NIPS) 2007 conference for the paper An Analysis of Convex Relaxations for MAP Estimation
- Royal Society Wolfson Research Merit Award in 2007.
- Marr Prize in computer vision in 1998.
- Torr's thesis included the algorithm design for Boujou, released by 2D3, together with Andrew Zisserman, Paul Beardsley and Andrew Fitzgibbon. Boujou has been used in films including Harry Potter and the Deathly Hallows – Part 1, which was nominated for the 2010 Oscar for Best Visual Effects. Boujou has won a Computer Graphics World Innovation Award, IABM Peter Wayne Award, and CATS Award for Innovation, and a technical Emmy Award.

== Personal life ==
Torr is the son of Harriet Torr. His Who's Who entry lists his recreations as martial arts, salsa, bachata dance and war games.
