= Koenderink =

Koenderink is a Dutch surname. Notable people with this surname include:

- Ben Koenderink (born 1990), Dutch-Canadian pair skater
- Gijsje Koenderink (born 1974), Dutch biophysicist
- Jan Koenderink (born 1943), Dutch physicist and psychologist

== See also ==
- Koenderink Prize in computer vision
