= Pascal Vitali Fua =

Pascal Fua
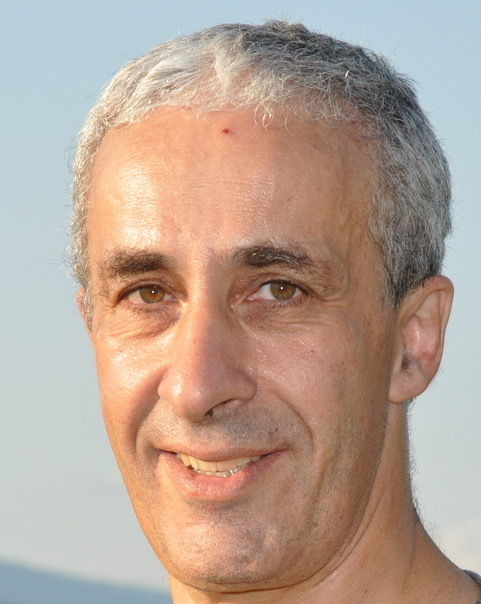
- Citizenship: French and Swiss
- Occupation: Computer science professor
- Awards: IEEE Fellow

Academic background
- Education: PhD in Computer Vision
- Alma mater: Ecole Polytechnique
- Thesis: (1989)
- Doctoral advisor: Olivier Faugeras

Academic work
- Institutions: École Polytechnique Fédérale de Lausanne (EPFL), INRIA, SRI International
- Doctoral students: Raquel Urtasun
- Main interests: 3D Computer Vision, Biomedical imaging, Machine Learning.
- Website: https://people.epfl.ch/pascal.fua/

Pascal Fua is a computer science professor at EPFL (École Polytechnique Fédérale de Lausanne, Lausanne, Switzerland). He received an engineering degree from École Polytechnique, Paris, in 1984 and a Ph.D. in computer science from the University of Orsay in 1989. He joined EPFL in 1996. Before that, he worked at SRI International and at INRIA Sophia-Antipolis as a computer scientist.

His expertise is in computer vision and machine learning, including motion recovery from images, analysis of microscopy images, and 3D shape modeling. He is best known for developing innovative methods for 3D reconstruction of deformable surfaces from monocular image sequences, for detecting and matching image keypoints, and for video-based people tracking.

He has cofounded three spinoff companies: Pix4D, PlayfulVision (acquired by Genius Sports), and NeuralConcept. He has been an Associate Editor of IEEE journal Transactions for Pattern Analysis and Machine Intelligence from 2004 to 2008 and often serves as program committee member, area chair, and program chair of major vision conferences.

== Awards ==
- Best paper award at AIAA, Best MDO Paper, together with Z. Wei, A. Yang, M. Bauerheim, and R. Liem (2024).
- ECCV Koenderink Prize for Fundamental Contributions in Computer Vision, together with M. Calonder, V. Lepetit, and C. Strecha (2020).
- IEEE Fellow for contributions to the theory and practice of three-dimensional shape recovery from images and video sequences (2012).
- An advanced ERC grant (2009) and two ERC PoC grants (2013, 2018).
- Best paper award at CVPR, together with J. Pilet and V. Lepetit (2005).
- BMVC best demonstration prize (2003).

== Selected Papers ==
- Achanta, Radhakrishna, et al. "SLIC superpixels compared to state-of-the-art superpixel methods." IEEE Transactions on Pattern Analysis and Machine Intelligence (2012).
- Calonder, Michael, et al. "Brief: Binary robust independent elementary features." European Conference on Computer Vision (2010).
- Lepetit, Vincent, et al. "Epnp: An accurate o (n) solution to the PnP problem." International Journal of Computer Vision (2009).
- Tola, Engin, et al. "Daisy: An efficient dense descriptor applied to wide-baseline stereo." IEEE Transactions on Pattern Analysis and Machine Intelligence (2010).
- Yi, Kwang, et al. "LIFT: Learned Invariant Feature Transform." European Conference on Computer Vision (2016).
- Berclaz, Jérôme et al. "Multiple object tracking using k-shortest paths optimization." IEEE Transactions on Pattern Analysis and Machine Intelligence (2011).
