= Kristen Grauman =

Computer vision and machine learning researcher

- Born: Kristen Lorraine Grauman; 1979 (age 46–47)
- Education: Boston College (BS); Massachusetts Institute of Technology (MS, PhD)
- Awards: National Science Foundation CAREER Award (2015); Presidential Early Career Award for Scientists and Engineers (2013)
- Scientific career
- Fields: Computer vision Machine learning
- Workplaces: University of Texas at Austin; Facebook; Intel; Lawrence Berkeley National Laboratory
- Thesis: Matching sets of features for efficient retrieval and recognition (2006)
- Doctoral advisor: Trevor Darrell
- Website: www.cs.utexas.edu/~grauman

Kristen Lorraine Grauman is a professor of computer science at the University of Texas at Austin on leave as a research scientist at Facebook AI Research (FAIR). She works on computer vision and machine learning.

== Early life and education ==
Grauman studied computer science at Boston College, graduating summa cum laude in 2001. She joined Massachusetts Institute of Technology for her postgraduate studies, earning a Master of Science degree in 2003 followed by a PhD in 2006 supervised by Trevor Darrell. During her PhD Grauman worked as a research intern at Intel and Lawrence Berkeley National Laboratory.

== Career and research ==
In 2007 Grauman was appointed Clare Boothe Luce Assistant Professor at University of Texas at Austin. Her research looks to develop algorithms that can categorise and detect objects. She is interested in how computer vision can solicit information from humans. She was promoted to Associate Professor with tenure in 2011.

She is an Alfred P. Sloan Foundation Fellow. She was awarded an Office of Naval Research young investigator award in 2012. In 2013 she was awarded a Pattern Analysis and Machine Intelligence (PAMI) Young Researcher Award. She is working on techniques to get computers to watch and summarise videos for easy viewing. The egocentric films will be used to aid the elderly and those with impaired-memories.

She has developed several patents for machine learning; including pyramid match kernel methods and a technique to efficiently identifying images.

Grauman serves as associate editor-in-chief of the IEEE Transactions on Pattern Analysis and Machine Intelligence. As of May 2018, Grauman is on leave at Facebook AI Research (FAIR).

=== Awards and honors ===
Her awards and honors include:

- 2023 Fellow of the American Association for the Advancement of Science
- 2019 IEEE Elected Fellow
- 2019 AAAI Fellow
- 2018 International Association for Pattern Recognition J. K. Aggarwal Prize
- 2017 University of Texas at Austin Academy of Distinguished Teachers
- 2017 Helmholtz Prize
- 2015 National Science Foundation CAREER Award in 2015.
- 2013 IJCAI Computers and Thought Award
- 2013 Presidential Early Career Award for Scientists and Engineers
- 2012 University of Texas System Regents' Outstanding Teaching Award
- 2011 IEEE Intelligent Systems AI's Ten to Watch
