= AudienceProject =

- Formerly: UserReport
- Company type: Privately held company
- Industry: Advertising
- Founded: 2010; 15 years ago
- Founders: Søren Hoelgaard Justesen, Mogens Storgaard Jakobsen, Henrik Lauritzen
- Headquarters: Copenhagen, Denmark
- Area served: Worldwide
- Key people: Henrik Lauritzen (CEO)
- Products: UserReport, AudienceHub, AudienceReport, AudienceData and EngagementReport
- Number of employees: 70 (2024)
- Website: audienceproject.com

AudienceProject is a Danish technology market research company founded in Copenhagen, Denmark which has operations worldwide. The company provides marketing and advertising tools and services that help publishers, agencies and advertisers identify, build, reach and measure audiences.

The company is headquartered in Denmark and has offices in the United Kingdom, Germany, France, India and Ukraine.

== History ==
In 2010, a group of market researchers from the Nordic research company Epinion founded AudienceProject (under the name UserReport) with the purpose of improving marketing research in the digital age. Shortly after the inception of the company, AudienceProject released its UserReport survey tool and Feedback Forum.

In 2012, after launching their research and audience panels in the Nordics, AudienceProject released its audience measurement tool AudienceReport and brand lift service EngagementReport.

In 2014, AudienceProject introduced its first targeting segments, enabling partners to utilise the company's online panel and data pool.

In 2015, the company was rebranded as AudienceProject. Shortly after the rebranding of the company, AudienceProject introduced an integration between AudienceReport and TechEdge, enabling partners to see the effects of their digital and TV advertising in one coherent audience measurement.

In 2016, AudienceReport won a Digiday award for Best Audience Measurement Platform for bringing efficiency, effectiveness and creativity to media and marketing processes.

In 2018, AudienceProject introduced the first individually-based addressable TV measurement service.

In 2019, AudienceProject released its self-service platform AudienceHub, enabling partners to build and activate their own unique targetable audiences. Later that year, AudienceProject joined forces with the three biggest Danish broadcasters (TV 2, Nordic Entertainment Group and Discovery), Seer-undersøgelsen and TechEdge to introduce the Danish Market Standard - a transparent measurement standard for addressable TV campaigns.

In 2020, AudienceProject was chosen by the official measurement of user statistics for Finnish websites and apps, Media Metrics Finland, to provide the technology for the measurement of page views and demographics for 300-400 of Finland's biggest websites and apps.
