= Olivier Faugeras =

French computer scientist

- Born: 22 December 1949; Neuilly-sur-Seine, France
- Education: École Polytechnique; University of Utah; University of Paris VI
- Scientific career
- Fields: Computer vision Computational neuroscience
- Workplaces: Inria Rocquencourt; University of Southern California; University of Paris XI; École Polytechnique; MIT; Inria Sophia Antipolis
- Thesis: Digital color image processing and psychophysics within the framework of a human visual model (1976)
- Doctoral advisor: Thomas Stockham
- Doctoral students: Nicholas Ayache; QT Luong; Zhengyou Zhang; Pascal Vitali Fua

Olivier Dominique Faugeras (born 1949) is a French computer scientist and director of research at Inria Sophia Antipolis. He is a member of the French Academy of Sciences and the French Academy of Technologies, and recipient of the 2014 Okawa Prize for his pioneering contributions to computer vision and computational neuroscience.

== Biography ==
Faugeras was born in Neuilly-sur-Seine, France and attended the Lycée Louis-le-Grand. He graduated in mathematics and physics from the École Polytechnique in 1971 and attended the École Nationale Supérieure des Télécommunications for his masters in electrical engineering in 1973. He then attended the University of Utah for his PhD in computer science and graduated in 1976. He then became a junior scientist at Inria Rocquencourt until 1979. He spent a year as an assistant professor at the University of Southern California and then returned to France to serve as an associate professor at University of Paris-Sud and for his ScD in mathematics from the University of Paris VI, which he received in 1981. He then returned to Inria Rocquencourt as a senior scientist and in 1989, he moved to Inria Sophia Antipolis. From 1996 to 2001, he was an adjunct professor at the MIT Computer Science and Artificial Intelligence Laboratory.

In 1989 he received the Institut de France Fondation Fiat award from the French Academy of Sciences for his contributions in computer vision. In 1998, he received the France Telecom Prize from the French Academy of Sciences, in addition to being elected a member. In 2000 he was one of the founding members of the French Academy of Technologies. In 2008, together with QT Luong and Steve Maybank, he received at European Conference on Computer Vision the initial Koenderink Prize for Fundamental Contributions in Computer Vision. In 2015 he received at ICCV the PAMI Azriel Rosenfeld Lifetime Achievement Award.
