= QT Luong =

American photographer

- Born: Quang-Tuan Luong; Paris, France
- Known for: Photography, Computer Vision

QT Luong (born 1964) is a French-Vietnamese born American photographer known for his work in the U.S. National Parks, as well as for work in the theory of computer vision. In 2022, Luong received the Ansel Adams Award for Conservation Photography from the Sierra Club.

== Early life and career ==
Luong was born in Paris of Vietnamese parents and graduated from École Polytechnique. He earned a Ph.D. in computer science at University of Paris-Sud in 1992. His thesis, in computer vision, introduced the concepts of Fundamental matrix and camera auto-calibration. In 2008, together with Olivier Faugeras and Steve Maybank, he received the initial Koenderink Prize, for fundamental contributions in computer vision. Luong left his career as a research scientist at SRI International to become a full-time photographer in 2007.

== Photography of the National Parks ==
While in school, Luong had developed an interest in photography as a means to capture his mountaineering outings. They would include climbs of difficult frozen waterfalls and a solo ascent of Denali.

After moving to California to work at UC Berkeley in 1993, influenced by the West Coast landscape photography tradition, he learned to use large format cameras, and in the process created the website largeformatphotography.info. His growing interest for large format photography and the exhilaration of discovering the diversity of the U.S. national parks inspired him to try to photograph each of them with a large format 5x7 film camera. He made his permanent home in California. By 2002 he had photographed all the (then) 57 national parks and was the first to do so.

He has since continued to work in the national parks in great depth using his uncommon wilderness skills, creating a singularly comprehensive record of United States landscape. The New York Times wrote of him:

 No one has captured the vast beauty of America’s landscape as comprehensively

In 2013, he was the first to photograph all the 59 national parks. He continued that streak in 2018, when Gateway Arch was established as the 60th national park and again in 2019 when Indiana Dunes was established as the 61st national park and White Sands was established as the 62nd national park. As of 2019, Luong continues to use a large format film camera to photograph the national parks. He is the only person known to have photographed each of the U.S. national parks on film.

In 2009, Ken Burns and Dayton Duncan featured him as the only living artist in The National Parks: America’s Best Idea and used his photograph Yosemite, Winter Sunset for the series' cover. In 2016, the U.S. Postal Service used his photograph of the Little Missouri River winding through the badlands of North Dakota’s Theodore Roosevelt National Park on a stamp celebrating the National Park Service’s Centennial, and in 2023 they featured three of his photographs in a series of postage stamps celebrating waterfalls.

In 2020, Luong received the Robin W. Winks Award for Enhancing Public Understanding of National Parks from the National Parks Conservation Association.

== Photography of the National Monuments ==
In 2018, as a reaction to the review of national monuments via Executive Order 13792 and the subsequent reductions in size of Bears Ears National Monument and Grand Staircase–Escalante National Monument, Luong embarked on a project to photograph all the 22 national monuments on land under review, resulting in the publication in 2021 of the book Our National Monuments: America's Hidden Gems. The book was a winner of the National Outdoor Book Awards in 2022.

== Exhibits and Publications ==
Luong organized the only exhibition featuring one large-format color photograph for each of the national parks. After debuting in 2010 at the National Heritage Museum it traveled across the country and in 2019 started touring internationally in China at the Li Yuan Photographic Art Museum in Ningbo.

In 2016, to celebrate the National Park Service's Centennial, Luong published his major book Treasured Lands: A Photographic Odyssey through America’s National Parks. It received positive reviews, with some considering it to be the best photography book about the national parks, and won several national book awards including the Benjamin Franklin Award from the Independent Book Publishers Association, the Independent Publisher Book Awards, and the Nautilus Book Awards.

== Books ==
- The Geometry of Multiple Images: The Laws That Govern the Formation of Multiple Images of a Scene and Some of Their Applications MIT Press 2001 ISBN 978-0262062206
- Spectacular Yosemite Universe 2011 ISBN 978-0789322241
- America's Fifty-Nine National Parks True North Editions 2016 ISBN 978-1943013036
- Treasured Lands: A Photographic Odyssey through America's National Parks Cameron and Company 2016 ISBN 978-1944903008
- Our National Monuments: America's Hidden Gems Terra Galleria Press 2021 ISBN 978-1733576079
