= Zhengyou Zhang =

Chinese computer scientist

Zhengyou Zhang is a Chinese professor of computer science, IEEE and ACM Fellow and a specialist in computer vision and graphics. He is also a recipient of the 2013 Helmholtz Test of Time Award which was awarded to him by the International Conference on Computer Vision.

== Early life ==
Zhang earned a degree in electronic engineering from the Zhejiang University in 1985 and two years later earned a master's degree in computer science from the University of Nancy where his advisor was Jean-Paul Haton. In 1990 he defended his PhD at the University of Paris-Sud where his adviser was Olivier Faugeras and then received the doctor of science degree at the same place in 1994. After 20 years of work at Microsoft Research in Redmond, Washington., Dr. Zhang joined Tencent in 2018 and is currently leading both the Robotic X Lab and AI Lab at Tencent.
