= Azriel Rosenfeld Award =

In computer vision, the Azriel Rosenfeld Award, or Azriel Rosenfeld Life Time Achievement Award was established at ICCV 2007 in Rio de Janeiro to honor outstanding researchers who are recognized as making significant contributions to the field of Computer Vision over longtime careers. This award is in memory of the computer scientist and mathematician Prof. Azriel Rosenfeld.

== Recipients ==
The first Azriel Rosenfeld Award was presented at ICCV 2007 in Rio de Janeiro, Brazil, to Takeo Kanade.

The second Azriel Rosenfeld Award was presented at ICCV 2009 in Kyoto Japan, to Berthold K.P. Horn.

The third Azriel Rosenfeld Award was presented at ICCV 2011 in Barcelona, Spain, to Thomas Huang.

The fourth Azriel Rosenfeld Award was presented at ICCV 2013 in Sydney, Australia, to Jan Koenderink.

The fifth Azriel Rosenfeld Award was presented at ICCV 2015 in Santiago, Chile, to Olivier Faugeras.

The sixth Azriel Rosenfeld Award was presented at ICCV 2017 in Venice, Italy to Tomaso Poggio.

The seventh Azriel Rosenfeld Award was presented at ICCV 2019 in Seoul, Korea to Shimon Ullman.

The eighth Azriel Rosenfeld Award was presented in 2021 at the ICCV (held virtually that year), to Ruzena Bajcsy.

The tenth Azriel Rosenfeld Award was presented at ICCV 2025 in Honolulu, Hawaii to Rama Chellappa.

== See also ==
- List of engineering awards
- List of computer science awards
