= Devi Parikh =

American computer scientist

- Education: Carnegie Mellon University
- Known for: Visual Question Answering (VQA), AI research
- Scientific career
- Fields: Computer vision, Natural language processing
- Workplaces: Meta, Georgia Tech, Virginia Tech

Devi Parikh is an American computer scientist.

== Career ==
Parikh earned her PhD in Electrical and Computer Engineering at Carnegie Mellon University. She has served as a professor at Virginia Tech and Georgia Tech, and as of 2022 she is a research director at Meta.

== Research ==
Parikh's research focuses on computer vision and natural language processing.

In 2015, Parikh and her students at Virginia Tech worked on AI for Visual Question Answering (VQA). This technology allows users to ask questions about pictures, e.g. "Is this a vegetarian pizza?" Parikh's VQA dataset has been used to evaluate over 30 AI models.

In 2017, Parikh published a conversational agent called ParlAI. In 2020, she developed an AI system that generates dance moves in sync with songs. In 2022, Parikh and a team at Meta developed Make-a-Video, a text-to-video AI model that is based on the diffusion algorithm.

== Awards ==
- 2017 IJCAI Computers and Thought Award
- 2011 ICCV Best-Paper Award ("Marr Prize")
