= Kyoung Mu Lee =

South Korean computer scientist

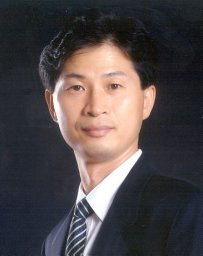
- Citizenship: South Korean
- Education: Seoul National University (BS, MS); University of Southern California (PhD)
- Awards: IEEE Fellow (2021), Samil Award (2022)
- Scientific career
- Fields: Computer vision, Artificial Intelligence
- Workplaces: Seoul National University, Hongik University
- Thesis: Shape from shading : models, algorithms and analysis (1993)
- Doctoral advisor: C.-C. Jay Kuo
- Website: cv.snu.ac.kr/kmlee

Kyoung Mu Lee (Korean: 이경무) is a South Korean computer scientist and professor at Seoul National University (SNU). His research specializes in computer vision, specifically image restoration, 3D human pose estimation, and visual tracking. Since 2021, he has served as the Editor-in-Chief of the IEEE Transactions on Pattern Analysis and Machine Intelligence (TPAMI). According to Google Scholar, his publications have received over 50,000 citations.

== Education and Career ==
Lee completed his B.S. and M.S. at Seoul National University in 1984 and 1986. He received a Ph.D. in Electrical Engineering from the University of Southern California in 1993. His doctoral thesis, titled Shape from shading : models, algorithms and analysis, was supervised by C.-C. Jay Kuo.

Lee was a faculty member at Hongik University from 1995 to 2003, after which he joined the Department of Electrical and Computer Engineering at SNU. He held the position of Vice Dean of the College of Engineering between 2009 and 2011. He currently leads the SNU Computer Vision Laboratory and the Interdisciplinary Program in Artificial Intelligence.

== Research ==
Lee's research involves the application of deep learning to image restoration and 3D modeling.

=== Image Restoration and Super-Resolution ===
Lee's research group developed the VDSR (Very Deep Super-Resolution) algorithm in 2016, which utilized global skip-connections in deep convolutional neural networks. In 2017, he co-authored the EDSR (Enhanced Deep Residual Networks) architecture. This model won the NTIRE 2017 Single Image Super-Resolution Challenge and has received over 10,000 citations.

In 2017, Lee introduced the GOPRO dataset, a benchmark for non-uniform deblurring collected using high-speed cameras to provide realistic motion blur pairs.

=== 3D Pose Estimation ===
Lee developed V2V-PoseNet, a voxel-to-voxel network for 3D human and hand pose estimation. His lab released the InterHand2.6M dataset in 2020 for 3D interacting hand pose benchmarks.

== Professional Leadership ==
Lee is the first Asian-based scholar to serve as Editor-in-Chief of IEEE Transactions on Pattern Analysis and Machine Intelligence. He was the General Chair for the 2019 International Conference on Computer Vision (ICCV) in Seoul and ACM Multimedia 2018. He founded the Korean Conference on Computer Vision (KCCV) and served as President of the Korean Computer Vision Society (KCVS).

== Awards and Honors ==
- Fellow, Institute of Electrical and Electronics Engineers (IEEE), 2021
- 63rd Samil Prize (Academic Category), 2022
- Member, Korean Academy of Science and Technology (KAST)
- Member, National Academy of Engineering of Korea (NAEK)

== Selected Publications ==
- Lim, B; Son, S; Kim, H; Nah, S; Lee, KM (2017). "Enhanced Deep Residual Networks for Single Image Super-Resolution" (PDF). Proceedings of the IEEE Conference on Computer Vision and Pattern Recognition Workshops (CVPRW).
- Kim, J; Lee, JK; Lee, KM (2016). "Accurate Image Super-Resolution Using Very Deep Convolutional Networks" (PDF). Proceedings of the IEEE Conference on Computer Vision and Pattern Recognition (CVPR).
- Nah, S; Kim, TH; Lee, KM (2017). "Deep Multi-scale Convolutional Neural Network for Dynamic Scene Deblurring" (PDF). Proceedings of the IEEE Conference on Computer Vision and Pattern Recognition (CVPR).
