= Edward Adelson =

American neuroscientist (born 1952)

- Born: Edward Howard Adelson
- Education: Yale University; University of Michigan
- Awards: Adolph Lomb Medal (1984); Rank Prize in Opto-electronics (1992); IEEE Computer Society Longuet-Higgins Prize (2005) (2010); IEEE Computer Society Helmholtz Award (2013)
- Scientific career
- Fields: Vision science
- Workplaces: NYU; RCA Laboratories; MIT; MIT Media Lab
- Thesis: The response of the rod system to bright flashes of light (1979)
- Doctoral advisor: John Jonides
- Doctoral students: Eero Simoncelli; William T. Freeman; Roland William Fleming

Edward H. Adelson (born 1952) is an American neuroscientist who is the John and Dorothy Wilson Professor of Vision Science at Massachusetts Institute of Technology. He is an elected Fellow of the National Academy of Sciences and American Academy of Arts and Sciences. He holds an appointment in MIT's Department of Brain and Cognitive Sciences and is a member of the Computer Science and Artificial Intelligence Laboratory (CSAIL). His research spans human and machine vision, computer graphics, computational photography, and robotic touch sensing.

== Education and career ==
Adelson earned a bachelor's degrees in Physics and Philosophy from Yale University in 1974. He then attended the University of Michigan for his Ph.D. in Experimental Psychology, graduating in 1979. He was a postdoctoral fellow at NYU from 1979 to 1981, after which he joined RCA Sarnoff Laboratories in Princeton, NJ, as a staff scientist for five years. While at RCA he worked with Peter Burt on the Laplacian Pyramid and with James R. Bergen on motion energy models.

Adelson developed computational models of human vision as well as human-inspired techniques in computer vision, computer graphics, and computational photography.

=== Multiscale image representation ===
With Peter J. Burt, Adelson developed the Laplacian pyramid, a technique for representing images at multiple scales that became a foundational tool in image compression, image blending, and computer vision more broadly.

=== Motion perception ===
In 1985, Adelson and Bergen published an influential model describing how the visual system extracts motion information by detecting oriented energy in space-time, a framework commonly known as the motion-energy model and still used as a standard reference point in vision-science research on direction discrimination. Later, with his student John Y. A. Wang, Adelson introduced a layered representation for motion analysis, in which an image sequence is decomposed into a set of overlapping layers so that motion discontinuities are attributed to object occlusion boundaries rather than to artifacts of a single flow field; this work received the IEEE Computer Society's Longuet-Higgins Prize in 2005.

=== Steerable filters ===
With William T. Freeman, Adelson also helped develop the theory of steerable filters, orientation-tunable image filters that can be synthesized efficiently from a small set of basis filters, work that has been applied widely in image analysis, texture synthesis, and edge detection. This work was honored with the IEEE Computer Society’s Helmholtz Prize in 2013.

=== Plenoptic function and computational photography ===
Adelson and Bergen formalized the concept of the plenoptic function, a description of all the light rays passing through every point in space, as a unifying framework for early vision. Building on this idea, Adelson and Wang later designed and built the first plenoptic camera, a single-lens device capable of recovering stereo depth information from a single image, an approach that anticipated later commercial light-field cameras. His work in computational photography has also addressed image merging, denoising, and high dynamic range imaging.

=== Material perception ===
Adelson has been a leading researcher in the study of how humans and machines perceive material properties such as glossiness, transparency, and roughness from images, an area of research he has described as central to understanding mid-level vision.

=== Tactile sensing ===
In the 2010s, Adelson's group developed GelSight, a vision-based tactile sensor that uses a soft, deformable elastomer surface and an internal camera to convert physical contact into high-resolution images of surface geometry, enabling robots to measure shape, force, and slip with a spatial resolution that can exceed that of human skin. The technology has since been applied to tasks such as estimating object hardness, recognizing surface textures, perceiving fabric properties, and manipulating cables and other deformable objects.

=== Startup companies ===
In 2011, Adelson co-founded GelSight, Inc., along with Kimo Johnson and János Rohály. The company, based in Waltham, MA, makes instruments for measuring high resolution surface topography, as well as tactile sensors for robotics. In 2018, Adelson co-founded Dynocardia, Inc., along with Mohan Thanikachalam and Abhijit Biswas. Dynocardia is developing devices for continuous non-invasive blood pressure monitoring.

Checker Shadow Illusion.

In 1995, Adelson created the Checker Shadow Illusion, an image of a checkerboard partly covered by a cast shadow in which two squares that are printed in the exact same shade of gray appear, because of surrounding context, to be different shades.. The illusion is widely used to demonstrate lightness constancy, the visual system's tendency to estimate the true reflectance of a surface despite changes in illumination, and Adelson has noted that the effect illustrates the general success, rather than a failure, of the visual system in interpreting real-world lighting conditions.

== Awards ==
During his time at RCA Laboratories, Adelson won the 1984 Adolph Lomb Medal from the Optical Society of America. He joined the faculty at MIT in 1987, first at the Media Lab before moving to the Department of Brain and Cognitive Sciences in 1994. In 1992, he received the Rank Prize in Opto-electronics, and in 2005 he received the Longuet-Higgins Prize from the IEEE Computer Society. In 2006, Adelson was elected a member of the United States National Academy of Sciences. In 2010, he was elected as fellow of the American Academy of Arts and Sciences. In 2013, he received the Helmholtz Award from the IEEE Computer Society. In 2020, he received the Ken Nakayama Medal for Excellence in Vision Science. In 2022, Adelson received the Kurt Koffka Medal for "advancing the fields of perception or developmental psychology to an extraordinary extent". In 2023 he received the 2023 Azriel Rosenfeld Lifetime Achievement Award by the IEEE Computer Society's Pattern Analysis and Machine Intelligence Technical Community (PAMI TC).

Adelson is also a fellow of the Society of Experimental Psychologists, fellow of Optica (formerly the Optical Society of America) and the American Association for the Advancement of Science.

== Selected publications ==
- Burt, P.; Adelson, E. (1983). "The Laplacian Pyramid as a Compact Image Code". IEEE Transactions on Communications. 31 (4): 532–540. Bibcode:1983ITCom..31..532B. doi:10.1109/tcom.1983.1095851. ISSN 0096-2244.
- Adelson, Edward H.; Bergen, James R. (February 1, 1985). "Spatiotemporal energy models for the perception of motion". Journal of the Optical Society of America A. 2 (2): 284–299. Bibcode:1985JOSAA...2..284A. doi:10.1364/josaa.2.000284. ISSN 1084-7529. PMID 3973762.
- Adelson, Edward H.; Bergen, James R. (October 24, 1991), "The Plenoptic Function and the Elements of Early Vision", Computational Models of Visual Processing, The MIT Press, doi:10.7551/mitpress/2002.003.0004, ISBN 978-0-262-29089-0
- Freeman, W.T.; Adelson, E.H. (1991). "The design and use of steerable filters". IEEE Transactions on Pattern Analysis and Machine Intelligence. 13 (9): 891–906. Bibcode:1991ITPAM..13..891F. doi:10.1109/34.93808. ISSN 0162-8828.
- Adelson, E.H.; Wang, J.Y.A. (1992). "Single lens stereo with a plenoptic camera". IEEE Transactions on Pattern Analysis and Machine Intelligence. 14 (2): 99–106. Bibcode:1992ITPAM..14...99A. doi:10.1109/34.121783. ISSN 0162-8828.
- Wang, J.Y.A.; Adelson, E.H. (1993). "Layered representation for motion analysis". Proceedings of IEEE Conference on Computer Vision and Pattern Recognition. IEEE Comput. Soc. Press. pp. 361–366. doi:10.1109/cvpr.1993.341105. ISBN 0-8186-3880-X.
- Yuan, Wenzhen; Dong, Siyuan; Adelson, Edward (November 29, 2017). "GelSight: High-Resolution Robot Tactile Sensors for Estimating Geometry and Force". Sensors. 17 (12): 2762. Bibcode:2017Senso..17.2762Y. doi:10.3390/s17122762. ISSN 1424-8220. PMC 5751610. PMID 29186053.

== See also ==
- Checker shadow illusion
