= Pushmeet Kohli =

Computer scientist

- Pushmeet Kohli at SXSW London 2026
- Born: Dehradun, Uttrakhand, India
- Education: National Institute of Technology, Warangal (BTech); Oxford Brookes University (PhD)
- Scientific career
- Fields: Machine learning Artificial intelligence Computer vision
- Workplaces: Google; DeepMind; University of Cambridge
- Thesis: Minimizing dynamic and higher order energy functions using graph cuts (2007)
- Doctoral advisor: Philip Torr
- Website: research.google/people/105667

Pushmeet Kohli is an Indian British computer scientist and Vice President of research at Google DeepMind. At Deepmind, he heads the "Science and Strategic Initiatives Unit". He was noted by Time magazine as being one of the 100 most influential people in AI according to the Time 100 AI list.

Kohli has led and supervised a number of projects including AlphaFold, a system for predicting the 3D structures of proteins; AlphaEvolve, a general-purpose evolutionary coding agent; SynthID, a system for watermarking and detecting AI-generated content; and Co-Scientist, an agent for generating and testing new scientific hypotheses.

== Education ==
Kohli received a Bachelor of Technology (BTech) degree in Computer Science and Engineering at the National Institute of Technology, Warangal. He went on to study at Oxford Brookes University, where he earned a PhD in computer vision for research supervised by Philip Torr in 2007.

== Career and research ==
After his PhD, Kohli was a postdoctoral associate at the Psychometric Centre, University of Cambridge. Before joining Google DeepMind, Kohli was partner scientist and director of research at Microsoft Research. His research investigates applications of machine learning and artificial intelligence.

Kohli has made research contributions in the fields of computational biology, program synthesis, superoptimization, discrete optimization, and psychometrics. Notable research projects he has contributed to include:

- AlphaFold - breakthrough AI system for protein structure prediction
- AlphaEvolve - agent for code super optimization.
- AlphaTensor - Reinforcement learning agent for discovering new algorithms for matrix multiplication
- SynthID - system for watermarking AI generated images.
- AlphaGenome and AlphaMissense - AI models for predicting the effect of mutations in the genome
- AlphaCode - Competition-level code generation with AI
- FunSearch - Discovering algorithms using LLMs to search over program space.
- Neural Program Synthesis
- Probabilistic Programming
- Community based Crowdsourcing of Data for Training AI Models
- Behavioral analysis and personality prediction using online networks
- Human Pose Estimation using the Kinect
- Learnt Magnetic confinement control for Fusion
- Learnt Density Functional for solving the fractional electron problem

=== Awards and honours ===
Kohli's research in computer vision and machine learning has been recognized by a number of scientific awards and prizes. Some notable ones include:

- Koenderink Prize (Test of Time award) by the European Conference of Computer Vision
- British Machine Vision Association and Society for Pattern Recognition (BMVA) Sullivan Prize for the best PhD thesis.
- IEEE Mixed Augmented Reality (ISMAR) Impact Paper award
- Lasting Impact Award by the ACM Symposium on User Interface Software and Technology
- Best paper award at the International World Wide Web Conference 2014
- Best paper award in the European Conference on Computer Vision (ECCV) 2010
- Best paper award in the Conference on Uncertainty in Artificial Intelligence (UAI)
