= William F. Schreiber =

American electrical engineer (1925–2009)

- Born: 1925; United States
- Died: September 21, 2009 (aged 84)
- Education: Columbia University (B.S., M.S), Harvard University (Ph.D)
- Known for: Optical character recognition Color printing
- Awards: SPIE Gold Medal (1989)
- Scientific career
- Fields: Electrical engineering
- Workplaces: MIT
- Doctoral advisor: Harry Rowe Mimno

William F. Schreiber (1925–2009) was an American electrical engineer and professor emeritus at the Massachusetts Institute of Technology (MIT). Schreiber had served on the advisory committee of the Federal Communications Commission. In March 1969, he founded the imaging systems supplier ECRM (Electronic Character Recognition Machinery), which designed a computer-based color printing system and an optical character recognition machine.

== Background ==
William F. Schreiber attended high school in New York City. As a child, he developed an interest in photography. He later went on to study at Columbia University’s Fu Foundation School of Engineering and Applied Science, where he received a BS and MS in electrical engineering. In 1953, he earned a PhD in applied physics at Harvard University’s School of Engineering and Applied Science, where he was selected as a Gordon McKay and Charles Coffin fellow. After schooling, Schreiber began working at Sylvania Electronics in 1947 at Technicolor Corporation in Hollywood, California in 1953.

== Career ==
From 1959 to 1990, Schreiber was a faculty member at MIT, in the Department of Electrical Engineering. He was also director of the Advanced Television Research Program, a visiting professor at the Indian Institute of Technology (IIT Kanpur) from 1964 to 1966, and a visiting scholar at the Swiss Federal Institute of Technology in 1990. As part of the MIT faculty, Schreiber helped to advance imaging processing systems in fields such as television and printing. He worked in graphic arts, including color printing, color correction, and laser scanning. His research in television included works on digital television and high-definition television. While at MIT, Schreiber also continued his consulting practice, serving as an expert in patent litigations.

== Recognition ==
William Schreiber received numerous distinctions for his contribution to electrical engineering and information technology. He was a member of the Technical Association for the Graphic Arts and SPIE, and a fellow of IEEE and Society of Motion Picture and Television Engineers. He received TAGA's Honors Award, the David Sarnoff Gold Medal, the Gold Medal of the International Society for Optical Engineering. He had also been a four-time recipient of the SMPTE Journal Award. Schreiber was a member of the National Academy of Engineering.

== Notable Students ==
- Thomas Huang
