= Zeynep Akata =

Turkish computer scientist

- Education: INRIA Grenoble-Rhônes-Alpes (PhD)
- Scientific career
- Institutions: Technical University of Munich
- Thesis: Contributions to large-scale learning for image classification (2014)
- Doctoral advisor: Cordelia Schmid
- Website: www.eml-munich.de/people/zeynep-akata

Zeynep Akata is a Liesel Beckmann Distinguished professor of computer science at the Technical University of Munich where she leads the Interpretable and Reliable Machine Learning chair. Akata is also the director of the Helmholtz Institute for Explainable Machine Learning.

== Education and career ==
Akata received her undergraduate degree in Trakya University in Turkey, her MSc from RWTH Aachen and Ph.D. in computer science at the INRIA Grenoble-Rhônes-Alpes. She was a post-doctoral research fellow at the Max Planck Institute for Informatics with Bernt Schiele and at University of California, Berkeley with Trevor Darrell. Akata was an assistant professor at the University of Amsterdam from 2017 to 2019 and she was a full professor at the Cluster of Excellence Machine Learning at the University of Tübingen between 2019 and 2023. While in Tübingen, Akata was also a senior research scientist at the Max Planck Institute for Intelligent Systems, Tübingen.

== Research ==
Akata's research interests focus on Explainable Multimodal Machine Learning which is in the intersection between Machine Learning, Computer Vision and Natural Language Processing.

== Selected awards and honours ==
- 2023 Alfried Krupp Prize
- 2022 ECVA Young Researcher Award
- 2021 German Pattern Recognition Award
- 2019 ERC Starting Grant
- 2019 Young Scientist Honour from the Werner-von-Siemens-Ring foundation
- 2014 Lise-Meitner Award for Excellent Women in Computer Science from the Max Planck Society
