= Trevor Darrell =

American computer scientist

- Education: University of Pennsylvania Massachusetts Institute of Technology
- Scientific career
- Fields: Computer Science
- Workplaces: University of California, Berkeley
- Doctoral advisor: Alex Pentland
- Website: https://people.eecs.berkeley.edu/~trevor/

Trevor Jackson Darrell is an American computer scientist and professor in the Computer Science Division of the University of California, Berkeley. His research interests include computer vision, machine learning, computer graphics, and perception-based human–computer interaction.

Darrell's research has included visual recognition, object and activity recognition, multimodal interaction, and machine learning methods for visual perception.

== Early life and education ==
Darrell received a B.S.E. in computer science from the University of Pennsylvania in 1988. He subsequently studied at the Massachusetts Institute of Technology (MIT), where he received an S.M. degree in 1992 and a Ph.D. in 1996.

While an undergraduate at Pennsylvania, Darrell began working in computer vision as a researcher in Ruzena Bajcsy's GRASP Laboratory.

== Career ==
After receiving his doctorate in 1996, Darrell joined Interval Research Corporation as a member of its research staff, where he worked until 1999. He then joined the faculty of MIT's Department of Electrical Engineering and Computer Science, serving from 1999 to 2008 and directing the Vision Interface Group.

In 2008, Darrell joined the faculty of the University of California, Berkeley, where he is a professor in the Computer Science and Electrical Engineering divisions of the Department of Electrical Engineering and Computer Sciences. He also led the Vision Group at the International Computer Science Institute (ICSI) from 2008 to 2014.

At Berkeley, Darrell founded and co-leads Berkeley Artificial Intelligence Research (BAIR) and the Berkeley DeepDrive industrial consortium. He also helped establish the BAIR Commons program.

From 2015 to 2021, Darrell served as faculty director of the Partners for Advanced Transportation Technology (PATH) research center at Berkeley.

== Research ==
Darrell's research has focused on computer vision, machine learning, artificial intelligence, computer graphics, and perception-based human–computer interfaces. His work has addressed visual recognition and detection, representation learning, multimodal interaction, and applications of machine learning to perception.

=== Pyramid match kernel ===
In collaboration with Kristen Grauman, Darrell developed the pyramid match kernel, a method for comparing sets of image features using multiresolution representations. Their paper, The Pyramid Match Kernel: Discriminative Classification with Sets of Image Features, was published at the International Conference on Computer Vision in 2005.

=== R-CNN ===
Darrell was a co-author, with Ross Girshick, Jeff Donahue, and Jitendra Malik, of Rich Feature Hierarchies for Accurate Object Detection and Semantic Segmentation, published at the Conference on Computer Vision and Pattern Recognition (CVPR) in 2014.

The paper introduced R-CNN, which combined bottom-up region proposals with convolutional neural networks for object detection. The authors reported substantial improvements over previous results on the PASCAL VOC object-detection benchmark.

=== DeCAF ===
Darrell was a co-author of DeCAF: A Deep Convolutional Activation Feature for Generic Visual Recognition, published at the International Conference on Machine Learning in 2014. The work investigated the use of features extracted from a pretrained deep convolutional network for tasks including scene recognition, domain adaptation, and fine-grained recognition.

The paper received the ICML Test of Time Award in 2024.

=== Caffe ===
Darrell was among the authors of Caffe: Convolutional Architecture for Fast Feature Embedding, which described the Caffe deep-learning framework developed at Berkeley. Caffe provided a framework for implementing and training convolutional neural networks and was released as open-source software.

The Caffe team received the Mark Everingham Prize at the International Conference on Computer Vision in 2017. Darrell was among the researchers named as recipients.

=== Fully convolutional networks ===
Darrell co-authored Fully Convolutional Networks for Semantic Segmentation with Jonathan Long and Evan Shelhamer. The paper was published at CVPR in 2015 and described convolutional networks that could accept inputs of arbitrary spatial dimensions and produce correspondingly sized outputs for semantic segmentation.

The authors applied the approach to semantic segmentation benchmarks including PASCAL VOC, NYUDv2, and SIFT Flow.

=== Robotics and multimodal interaction ===
Darrell has also worked on multimodal interaction and robotics. His research group has investigated perception and interaction involving robots and mobile devices, including visual and haptic information.

A paper co-authored by Darrell, Using Robotic Exploratory Procedures to Learn the Meaning of Haptic Adjectives, received the Best Cognitive Robotics Paper Award at the 2013 IEEE International Conference on Robotics and Automation (ICRA).

== Awards and honors ==
Darrell's research and collaborations have received awards from major computer vision, machine learning, robotics, and multimedia conferences.

Best Cognitive Robotics Paper Award, IEEE International Conference on Robotics and Automation, 2013, for Using Robotic Exploratory Procedures to Learn the Meaning of Haptic Adjectives.

Mark Everingham Prize, 2017, as a member of the Caffe team.

Helmholtz Prize, International Conference on Computer Vision, 2017, for work on the pyramid match kernel.

ICML Test of Time Award, 2024, for DeCAF: A Deep Convolutional Activation Feature for Generic Visual Recognition.

ACM SIGMM Test of Time Paper Award, 2024, for Caffe: Convolutional Architecture for Fast Feature Embedding.

Longuet-Higgins Prize, 2024, for Rich Feature Hierarchies for Accurate Object Detection and Semantic Segmentation.

The 2024 Longuet-Higgins Prize recognized the 2014 CVPR paper co-authored by Darrell, Ross Girshick, Jeff Donahue, and Jitendra Malik.

Academic and professional service

Darrell’s professional service has included roles associated with conferences such as CVPR, the International Conference on Computer Vision (ICCV), the International Conference on Machine Learning (ICML), and other computer science conferences.

He has also participated in research and advisory activities associated with organizations including the Defense Advanced Research Projects Agency (DARPA) and the National Science Foundation.

== Selected publications ==
Grauman, Kristen; Darrell, Trevor (2005). "The Pyramid Match Kernel: Discriminative Classification with Sets of Image Features". International Conference on Computer Vision.

Girshick, Ross; Donahue, Jeff; Darrell, Trevor; Malik, Jitendra (2014). "Rich Feature Hierarchies for Accurate Object Detection and Semantic Segmentation". Conference on Computer Vision and Pattern Recognition.

Donahue, Jeff; Jia, Yangqing; Vinyals, Oriol; Hoffman, Judy; Zhang, Ning; Tzeng, Eric; Darrell, Trevor (2014). "DeCAF: A Deep Convolutional Activation Feature for Generic Visual Recognition". International Conference on Machine Learning 32: 647–655.

Jia, Yangqing; Shelhamer, Evan; Donahue, Jeff; Karayev, Sergey; Long, Jonathan; Girshick, Ross; Guadarrama, Sergio; Darrell, Trevor (2014). "Caffe: Convolutional Architecture for Fast Feature Embedding". ACM Multimedia.

Long, Jonathan; Shelhamer, Evan; Darrell, Trevor (2015). "Fully Convolutional Networks for Semantic Segmentation". Conference on Computer Vision and Pattern Recognition: 3431–3440.

Andreas, Jacob; Rohrbach, Marcus; Darrell, Trevor; Klein, Dan (2016). "Learning to Compose Neural Networks for Question Answering". NAACL.
