= Henry Bright =

Henry Bright may refer to:

- Henry Bright (schoolmaster, born 1562) (1562–1627), English priest and schoolmaster at the King's School, Worcester
- Henry Bright (schoolmaster, born 1724) (1724–1803), English priest and schoolmaster at Abingdon School and New College School
- Henry Bright (MP) (1784–1869), MP for Bristol
- Henry Bright (painter) (1810–1873), English painter
- Henry Arthur Bright (1830–1884), English merchant and author
- Henry Edward Bright (1819–1904), member of the South Australian colonial parliament
