= Patrick Winston =

American computer scientist (1943–2019)

Patrick Henry Winston
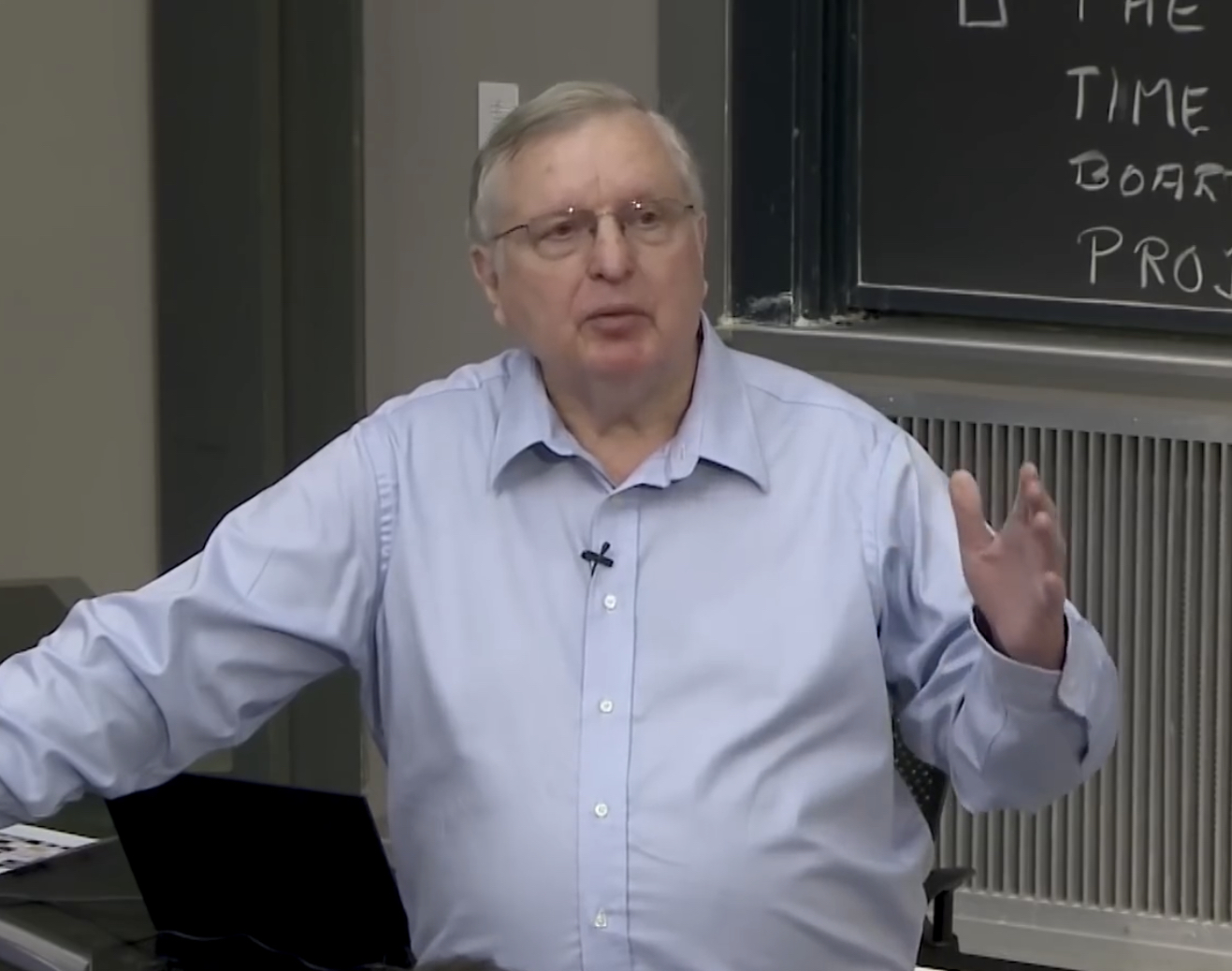
- Born: February 5, 1943; Peoria, Illinois, U.S.
- Died: July 19, 2019 (aged 76); Boston, Massachusetts, U.S.
- Education: MIT (BS 1965, MS 1967, PhD 1970)
- Spouse: Karen Prendergast
- Children: 1
- Awards: IJCAI Computers and Thought Award
- Scientific career
- Fields: Artificial Intelligence; Computer Science
- Thesis: Learning Structural Descriptions from Examples (1970)
- Doctoral advisor: Marvin Minsky
- Doctoral students: David Waltz; Philip Greenspun
- Website: Personal homepage

Patrick Henry Winston (February 5, 1943 – July 19, 2019) was an American computer scientist and professor at the Massachusetts Institute of Technology. Winston was director of the MIT Artificial Intelligence Laboratory from 1972 to 1997, succeeding his doctoral advisor Marvin Minsky, who left to help found the MIT Media Lab. Winston was succeeded as director by Rodney Brooks.

After graduating from high school, Winston left East Peoria, a suburb of Peoria, IL, to come to MIT by train. He received his undergraduate degree from MIT in 1965, where he was a member of Phi Delta Theta fraternity, and went on to complete his Masters and PhD there as well, finalizing his PhD in 1970. His research interests included machine learning and human intelligence. Winston was known within the MIT community for his excellent teaching and strong commitment to supporting MIT undergraduate culture.

At MIT, Winston taught 6.034: Artificial Intelligence and 6.803/6.833: Human Intelligence Enterprise. Winston's How to Speak talk was an MIT tradition for over 40 years. "Offered every January, the talk is intended to improve your speaking ability in critical situations by teaching you a few heuristic rules." In 2020, the MIT Press published a book with his insights and teachings on communication: Make It Clear: Speak and Write to Persuade and Inform.

Winston served as president of the Association for the Advancement of Artificial Intelligence from 1985 to 1987.

Winston died in Boston on July 19, 2019.

== Bibliography and publications ==
Winston authored a number of computer science and AI textbooks, including:

- Artificial Intelligence ISBN 0201533774
- The Psychology of Computer Vision ISBN 0070710481
- Lisp (with Berthold K.P. Horn) ISBN 0201083191
- On to C ISBN 020158042X
- On to C++ ISBN 0201580438
- On to Java (with Sundar Narasimhan) ISBN 0201725932
- On to Smalltalk ISBN 0201498278
