= Andrew Zisserman =

British computer scientist

- Born: 1957 (age 68–69)
- Education: University of Cambridge; Sunderland Polytechnic
- Known for: Multiple-view geometry
- Awards: Marr Prize (1993, 1998, 2003); FRS (2007)
- Scientific career
- Fields: Computer Science
- Workplaces: University of Edinburgh; University of Oxford; DeepMind
- Thesis: Fresh approaches to magnetostatic field calculations, with the emphasis on analytical techniques (1984)
- Doctoral advisor: James Caldwell
- Website: www.robots.ox.ac.uk/~az/

Andrew Zisserman FRS (born 1957) is a British computer scientist and a professor at the University of Oxford, and a researcher in computer vision. As of 2014 he is affiliated with DeepMind.

== Education ==
Zisserman received the Part III of the Mathematical Tripos, and his PhD in theoretical physics from the Sunderland Polytechnic.

== Career and research ==
In 1984, he started to work in the field of computer vision at the University of Edinburgh. Together with Andrew Blake they wrote the book Visual reconstruction published in 1987, which is considered one of the seminal works in the field of computer vision. According to Fitzgibbon (2008) this publication was "one of the first treatments of the energy minimisation approach to include an algorithm (called "graduated non-convexity") designed to directly address the problem of local minima, and furthermore to include a theoretical analysis of its convergence."

In 1987, he moved back to England to the University of Oxford, where he joined Mike Brady's newly founded robotics research group as a University Research Lecturer, and started to work on multiple-view geometry. According to Fitzgibbon (2008) his "geometry was successful in showing that computer vision could solve problems which humans could not: recovering 3D structure from multiple images required highly trained photogrammetrists and took a considerable amount of time. However, Andrew's interests turned to a problem where a six-year-old child could easily beat the algorithms of the day: object recognition."

=== Publications ===
Zisserman has published several articles, some of the most highly cited works in the field, and has edited a series of books. A selection:

- 1987. Visual reconstruction. With Andrew Blake.
- 1992. Geometric invariance in computer vision. Edited with Joseph Mundy.
- 1994. Applications of invariance in computer vision : second joint European-US workshop, Ponta Delgada, Azores, Portugal, 9–14 October 1993 : proceedings. With Joseph L. Mundy and David Forsyth (eds).
- 1996. ECCV '96 International Workshop (1996 : Cambridge, England) Object representation in computer vision II : ECCV '96 International Workshop, Cambridge, UK, 13–14 April 1996 : proceedings. With Jean Ponce, and Martial Hebert (eds.).
- 1999. International Workshop on Vision Algorithms (1999 : Corfu, Greece) Vision algorithms : theory and practice : International Workshop on Vision Algorithms, Corfu, Greece, 21–22 September 1999 : proceedings. With Bill Triggs and Richard Szeliski (eds.).
- 2000. Multiple view geometry in computer vision. With Richard Hartley. Second edition 2009.
- 2008. Computer vision – ECCV 2008 : 10th European conference on computer vision, Marseille, France, 12–18 October 2008, proceedings, part I. Edited with David Forsyth and Philip Torr.

== Awards and honours ==
Zisserman is an ISI Highly Cited researcher. He is the only person to have been awarded the Marr Prize three times, in 1993, in 1998, and in 2003. He was elected Fellow of the Royal Society in 2007. In 2008 he was awarded BMVA Distinguished Fellowship. In 2013 he received the Distinguished Researcher Award at ICCV. Zisserman received the 2017 Royal Society Milner Award “in recognition of his exceptional achievements in computer programming which includes work on computational theory and commercial systems for geometrical images.”
