= Cordelia Schmid =

German computer vision researcher, born 1967

- Born: 28 September 1967; Mainz, Germany
- Education: INRIA (PhD)
- Scientific career
- Workplaces: INRIA
- Thesis: Local Greyvalue Invariants for Image Matching and Retrieval (1996)
- Doctoral advisor: Roger Mohr
- Notable students: Zeynep Akata
- Website: thoth.inrialpes.fr/~schmid/

Cordelia Schmid (born 28 September 1967) is a computer vision researcher, currently head of the THOTH project team at INRIA (French Institute for Research in Computer Science and Automation), Montbonnot, France.

Schmid obtained a degree in computer science from the University of Karlsruhe, and her doctorate from the Institut National Polytechnique de Grenoble, with a prizewinning thesis on "Local Greyvalue Invariants for Image Matching and Retrieval".

Schmid was named Fellow of the Institute of Electrical and Electronics Engineers (IEEE) in 2012 for contributions to large-scale image retrieval, classification and object detection. She was a co-winner of the Longuet-Higgins Prize in 2006, in 2014, and again in 2016. In 2017, she became a member of the Academy of Sciences Leopoldina.

== Awards and prizes ==
- 2006, 2014, 2016 : Longuet-Higgins Prize
- 2020 : Milner Award
- 2023 : Körber European Science Prize
- 2024 : European Inventor Award
