= Berthold K.P. Horn =

American computer scientist (born 1943)

Berthold Klaus Paul Horn
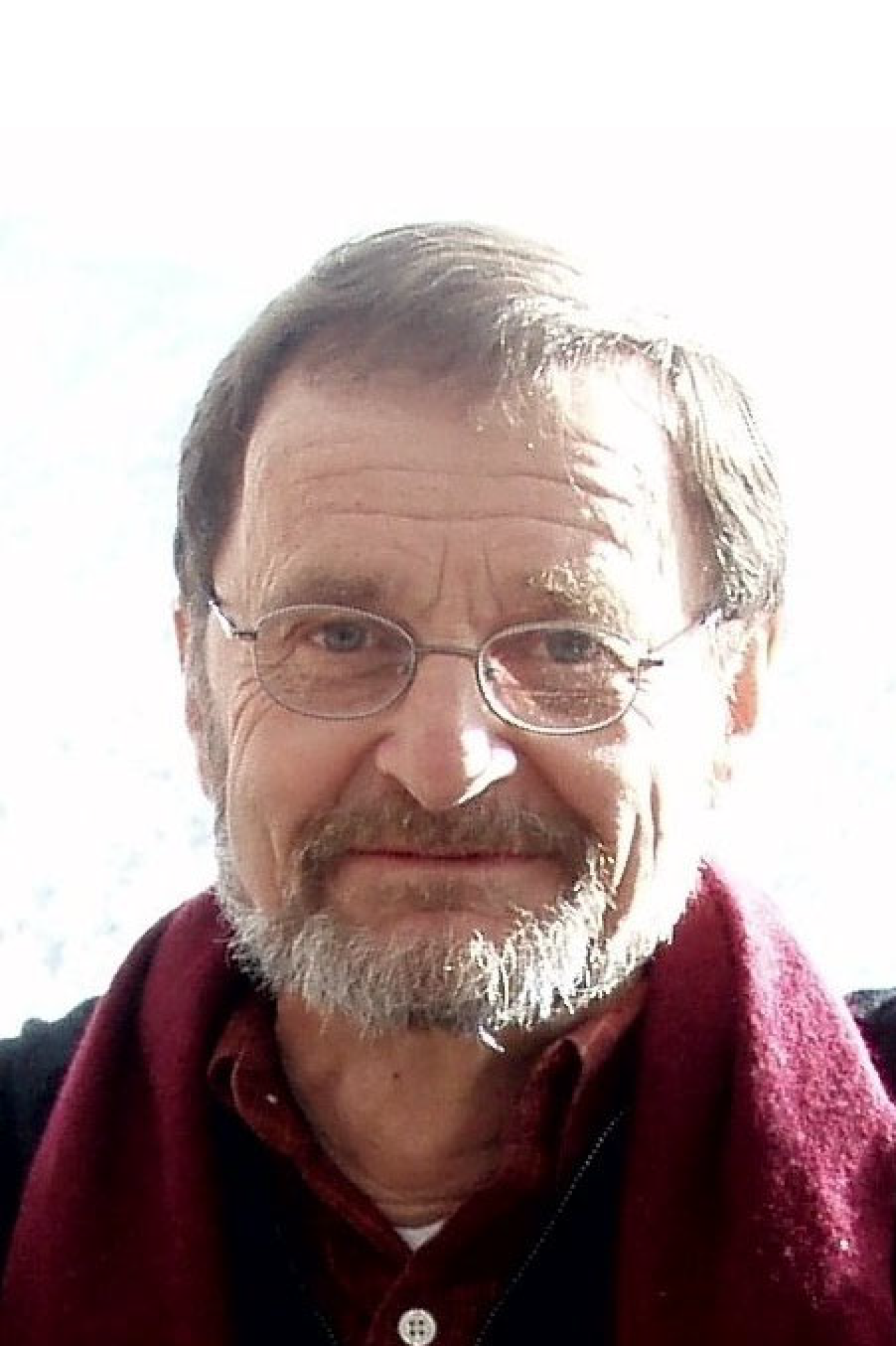
- Berthold Horn
- Born: December 8, 1943 (age 82); Teplice, German-occupied Czechoslovakia (now Czech Republic)
- Other names: Berthold K.P. Horn; Berthold Horn
- Citizenship: United States
- Occupations: Professor, researcher
- Relatives: Peter Horn (brother)
- Awards: Elected to the National Academy of Engineering; Azriel Rosenfeld Award

Academic background
- Education: University of Witwatersrand; Massachusetts Institute of Technology
- Thesis: Shape from Shading: A Method for Obtaining the Shape of a Smooth Opaque Object from One View (1970)
- Doctoral advisor: Marvin Minsky

Academic work
- Doctoral students: Matthew T. Mason; Marc Raibert; Shahriar Negahdaripour; Tomás Lozano-Pérez
- Notable students: Tomás Lozano-Pérez

Berthold Klaus Paul Horn (born December 8, 1943) is an American scientist working in the field of artificial intelligence and computer vision. He is Professor of Electrical Engineering and Computer Science at Massachusetts Institute of Technology (MIT). He is also Principal Investigator at the Computer Science and Artificial Intelligence Laboratory (CSAIL) at MIT.

Horn is the author of two books and over 300 articles. His research is focused on Machine Vision, Computational Imaging, Suppressing Traffic Flow Instabilities and Indoor Navigation.

Horn was elected a member of the National Academy of Engineering in 2002 for contributions to computer vision, including the recovery of three-dimensional geometry from image intensities. He received the Azriel Rosenfeld Award by IEEE in 2009.

== Early life and education ==
Horn was born in Teplice, German-occupied Czechoslovakia (currently in Czech Republic). His family emigrated from Germany to South Africa after World War II and Horn was brought up there. He joined the University of Witwatersrand in 1961 for his Bachelor of Science in Electrical Engineering studies. After completing his bachelor's degree in 1965, Horn taught Numerical Analysis at the university. During this time, he also worked as a consultant for the South African Navy to help them predict tides in the harbors.

One of his Professors, Derek S. Henderson, who contributed significantly in bringing the first computer to the University of Witwatersrand was, at the time, working on bringing a more powerful computer to the university. In order to facilitate the process and arrange the required software and equipment, Henderson asked Horn to travel to the U.S. During the trip, he visited several universities, took the GSAT examination and decided to study at MIT for his master's degree and later Ph.D. After completing his Ph.D. in 1970, Horn traveled back to South Africa and briefly taught at the University of Witwatersrand. Later he moved back to the United States and started teaching at MIT.

== Career ==
In 1970, he began teaching at MIT and continued teaching there for the next 4 decades, becoming associate professor in 1976 and Professor in 1984. In 1983, he was appointed as the Associate Editor of Computer Vision and Image Understanding. He also serves on the editorial board of International Journal of Computer Vision.

Horn was instrumental in the conversion to scalable, hinted outline format (Adobe Type 1) of Donald Knuth's Computer Modern fonts, The American Mathematical Society (AMS) fonts, LaTeX fonts, Michael Spivak's MathTime and MathTime Plus, as well as Charles Bigelow and Kris Holmes' Lucida Bright, Lucida Bright Expert and Lucida New Math fonts, all used in mathematical typesetting.

=== Research ===
Most of Horn's research has been focused on machine vision, particularly so-called "physics-based" machine vision, going back to the beginnings of the field in the 1960s. His thesis entitled Shape from Shading: A Method for Obtaining the Shape of a Smooth Opaque Object from One View was one of his first works in this area. Much of his work in the 1970s and 1980s is focused in this area on the topics of optical flow, photometric stereo as well as closed-form solutions of orientation problems of Photogrammetry.

During the 1990s, Horn's research interest began including Computational Imaging, which is the creation of an image based on raw measurements that are not directly related to local brightness or density values, but nonetheless capture some information about spatial distribution of matter. Some of his early work in computed tomography (CT) led to methods for reconstructing from fan-beam scans, which do not lend themselves to the widely known Fourier-slice theorem used for parallel beam scans. Through time, his research in this area moved towards structured illumination microscopy (SIM) and high resolution X-ray imaging, including phase reconstruction.

In 2013, Horn presented an algorithm at the IEEE Conference on Intelligent Transport Systems for reducing the problem of phantom traffic jams. He and his team studied traffic congestion and proposed that avoiding tailgating could decrease traffic jams. Their research proposed that keeping an equal distance from the car in the front and the back can reduce congestion and decrease commute time. They named their method the bilateral control. The research was published later in the IEEE Transactions on Intelligent Transportation Systems. The team developed an algorithm that dictates exactly how fast a vehicle should travel to avoid congestion. Horn proposed that their algorithm could be used to improve the cruise control systems on cars. Their later research was funded by Toyota. In this area, Horn is also working on improving vehicle safety and passenger comfort using inverse-time-to-contact (TTC) for control.

In the late 2010s Horn research also began including the topic of indoor location by means of Fine-Time-Measurement of Round-Trip-Time of electromagnetic waves at Wifi frequencies as a possible source for turn-by-turn navigation for the visually impaired.

== Books ==
Horn's first book LISP co-authored with Patrick Winston was published in 1981. It was a textbook written for students with no previous background in the computer language LISP. The book was divided in two parts; one dealt with the theory of the language and the second gave instance of practical use in the area of artificial intelligence. A second version of the book was published in 1984 followed by a third version in 1989.

Horn's second book, Robot Vision was published in 1986. The book was an outgrowth of one of his courses at MIT and covered the recent research in the area of image processing, machine vision and pattern recognition.

Horn co-edited with Michael J. Brooks, the 1989 book Shape from Shading, which explained how a three dimensional object may be recovered from shading in a two dimensional image of the object. The book was one of the first in its field to provide a comprehensive review of shape from shading.

== Awards and honors ==
- 1989 - Prize for Pioneering Work leading to Practical Vision Systems by Rank Prize Fund
- 1990 - American Association for Artificial Intelligence Inaugural Fellow
- 2002 - Elected to the National Academy of Engineering
- 2009 - Azriel Rosenfeld Lifetime Achievement Award by IEEE Computer Society

== Selected publications ==
=== Books ===
- LISP (1981)
- Robot Vision, MIT Press (1986), ISBN 9780262537377
- Shape from Shading (1989)

=== Articles ===
- BKP Horn: Understanding image intensities. Artificial intelligence 8 (2), 201–231, 1977.
- BKP Horn, BG Schunck: Determining optical flow. Artificial intelligence 17 (1–3), 185–203, 1981.
- BKP Horn: Hill shading and the reflectance map. Proceedings of the IEEE 69 (1), 14–47, 1981.
- K Ikeuchi, BKP Horn: Numerical shape from shading and occluding boundaries. Artificial intelligence 17 (1–3), 141–184, 1981.
- AR Bruss, BKP Horn: Passive navigation. Computer Vision, Graphics, and Image Processing 21 (1), 3-20, 1983.
- BKP Horn: Extended gaussian images. Proceedings of the IEEE 72 (12), 1671–1686, 1984.
- BKP Horn: Closed-form solution of absolute orientation using unit quaternions. JOSA A 4 (4), 629–642,1987.
- BKP Horn, HM Hilden, S Negahdaripour: Closed-form solution of absolute orientation using orthonormal matrices. JOSA A 5 (7), 1127–1135, 1988.
