= New College School =

Location
- Savile Road; Oxford, Oxfordshire, OX1 3UA; England
- Coordinates: 51.76818°N 1.25639°W

Information
- Type: Private preparatory School
- Motto: Manners Makyth Man
- Religious affiliation: Church of England
- Established: 1379; 647 years ago
- Founder: William of Wykeham, Bishop of Winchester
- Local authority: Oxfordshire
- Department for Education URN: 123291 Tables
- Chair: Miles Young
- Headmaster: Matthew Jenkinson
- Gender: Boys
- Age: 4 to 13
- Enrolment: 160 (approx.)
- Houses: Reynolds, Huxley, Wykeham, Spooner
- Publication: The Newswire and The Nucleus
- Website: http://www.newcollegeschool.org/

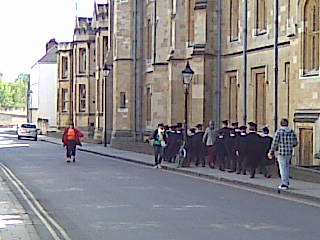
Choristers from New College School in gowns and mortarboards 'crocodile' to rehearsal in New College

NCS

New College School (officially St Mary's College School) is a private preparatory school for boys aged 4 to 13 in Oxford. It was founded in 1379 by William of Wykeham to provide for the education of 16 choristers for the chapel of New College, Oxford.

== History ==
New College School traces its origins to November 1379 when it was founded by William of Wykeham, Bishop of Winchester, as part of the foundation of the College of St Mary of Winchester in Oxford, more commonly known as New College. Wykeham himself paid for the choirboys, chaplains and clerks to sing for services at chapel. Records from the 1620s state that choirboys were accommodated on the College site itself, using an attic as the schoolroom. Despite a brief disruption due to the English Civil War the "school" continued to thrive. By the late 17th century, the vestry and song-room were refitted to accommodate new boys, marking the moment when the school started educating both choristers and non-choristers. The school did not have a permanent home for some years, moving back and forth between the College buildings and various sites outside the College. The current site was purchased in 1903 from Merton College. The school's houses (Eagles, Lions, Wolves, and Hawks) were renamed in the early twenty-first century to commemorate four famous figures from New College's past.

Although no longer exclusively educating choristers, the school maintains its ties with the College: the College's Warden is Chair of the school's governing committee and the school's pupils use the College sports facilities.

== Location and facilities ==
New College School is located on Savile Road in central Oxford, near New College. The school site has a sports hall which is used for multiple sports and shares New College's playing fields and cricket nets. Its most recent upgrade is the revamped sports pavilion, reopened in 2013. In September 2023, a three-sided Gradel quadrangle opened, shared with New College.

== Extracurricular activities ==
Sports form a major part of the school calendar. All boys from Year 3 to 8 are required to play football (Michaelmas term), hockey (Hilary term), and Cricket or Tennis (Trinity term). The school has a partnership with Oxford United F.C. and the England U16 rugby team which allows the boys to receive external coaching sessions. There are also lunchtime and after-school activities sessions where boys can participate in various hobby and interest clubs. Lunchtime activities are run every day apart from Wednesday and the after school programme operates on Monday–Friday evenings. On all days of the week other than Wednesdays, there are rehearsals and evensongs for the chorister students.

== Notable alumni of New College School ==
Staff

- Henry Bright: teacher and author
- Charles Oliver Mules: Bishop of Nelson (New Zealand)

Pupils

- Thomas Allen (1681–1755): clergyman and author
- Stephen Boxer: actor
- George Valentine Cox (1786–1875) [Master of NCS]: author
- Sir (Donald) Keith Falkner (1900–1994): singer and Director of the Royal College of Music
- Edmund Finnis: composer
- Roland Fleming: scientist
- James Gilchrist: tenor
- Howard Goodall: singer, composer, and broadcaster
- Theo Green: film composer
- Tim Hayward: writer, and broadcaster
- Orlando Higginbottom: musician better known as Totally Enormous Extinct Dinosaurs
- Sir Richard Goodwin Keats (1757–1834): admiral, Governor of the Royal Naval Hospital in Greenwich, and mentor to Nelson and King William IV
- Stephen Boxer: actor
- Edward Lucas (journalist)
- David Mitchell: comedian
- Ian Partridge tenor
- John Rogers (bap. 1678–1729): clergyman, royal chaplain, and author
- Paul Spicer: organist, producer, conductor, composer, Professor of Choral Conducting at the Royal College of Music
- Joseph Trapp (1679–1747): clergyman, poet, playwright, first Professor of Poetry at the University of Oxford, translator of complete works of Virgil (1731)
- William Tuckwell (1829–1919) [Master of NCS]: author and ‘radical parson’
- Howard Williams: conductor
- Francis Wise (1695–1767): author, archaeologist, Radcliffe Librarian
- Anthony Wood (1632–1695): antiquarian, historian, and author

== See also ==
- List of choir schools
- List of the oldest schools in the United Kingdom
- List of the oldest schools in the world
