= IJCAI Computers and Thought Award =

- Awarded for: recognizing outstanding young scientists in artificial intelligence
- Sponsored by: International Joint Conference on Artificial Intelligence (IJCAI)
- Date: Started in 1971
- Website: ijcai.org/awards

The IJCAI Computers and Thought Award is presented every two years by the International Joint Conference on Artificial Intelligence (IJCAI), recognizing outstanding young scientists in artificial intelligence. It was originally funded with royalties received from the book Computers and Thought (edited by Edward Feigenbaum and Julian Feldman), and is currently funded by IJCAI.

It is considered to be "the premier award for artificial intelligence researchers under the age of 35".

== Laureates ==
- Terry Winograd (1971)
- Patrick Winston (1973)
- Chuck Rieger (1975)
- Douglas Lenat (1977)
- David Marr (1979)
- Gerald Sussman (1981)
- Tom Mitchell (1983)
- Hector Levesque (1985)
- Johan de Kleer (1987)
- Henry Kautz (1989)
- Rodney Brooks (1991)
- Martha E. Pollack (1991)
- Hiroaki Kitano (1993)
- Sarit Kraus (1995)
- Stuart Russell (1995)
- Leslie Kaelbling (1997)
- Nicholas Jennings (1999)
- Daphne Koller (2001)
- Tuomas Sandholm (2003)
- Peter Stone (2007)
- Carlos Guestrin (2009)
- Andrew Ng (2009)
- Vincent Conitzer (2011)
- Malte Helmert (2011)
- Kristen Grauman (2013)
- Ariel D. Procaccia (2015)
- Percy Liang (2016) for his contributions to both the approach of semantic parsing for natural language understanding and better methods for learning latent-variable models, sometimes with weak supervision, in machine learning.
- Devi Parikh (2017)
- Stefano Ermon (2018)
- Guy Van den Broeck (2019) for his contributions to statistical and relational artificial intelligence, and the study of tractability in learning and reasoning.
- Piotr Skowron (2020) for his contributions to computational social choice, and to the theory of committee elections.
- Fei Fang (2021) for her contributions to integrating machine learning with game theory and the use of these novel techniques to tackle societal challenges such as more effective deployment of security resources, enhancing environmental sustainability, and reducing food insecurity.
- Bo Li (2022) for her contributions to uncovering the underlying connections among robustness, privacy, and generalization in AI, showing how different models are vulnerable to malicious attacks, and how to eliminate these vulnerabilities using mathematical tools that provide robustness guarantees for learning models and privacy protection.
- Pin-Yu Chen (2023) for his contributions to consolidating properties of trust, robustness and safety into rigorous algorithmic procedures and computable metrics for improving AI systems.
- Nisarg Shah (2024) for his contributions to AI and society, in particular foundational work on the theory of algorithmic fairness using principles from social choice theory.
- Aditya Grover (2025) for his foundational contributions uniting deep generative models, representation learning, and reinforcement learning, and for their applications in advancing scientific reasoning.

== See also ==
- List of computer science awards
