= C.-C. Jay Kuo =

Taiwanese electrical engineer (born 1957)

Chung-Chieh Jay Kuo
- 郭宗杰
- Born: 1957 (age 68–69); Hsinchu, Taiwan

Academic background
- Education: MIT (PhD, MS); National Taiwan University (BS)
- Thesis: Discretization and solution of elliptic PDEs--a transform domain approach (1987)
- Doctoral advisor: Bernard C. Levy; John Tsitsiklis

Academic work
- Institutions: University of Southern California; UCLA
- Doctoral students: Kyoung Mu Lee
- Website: mcl.usc.edu/people/cckuo/

Chung-Chieh Jay Kuo (Chinese: 郭宗杰; born 1957, Hsinchu, Taiwan) is a Taiwanese electrical engineer and the director of the Multimedia Communications Lab as well as distinguished professor of electrical engineering and computer science at the University of Southern California. He is a specialist in multimedia signal processing, video coding, video quality assessment, machine learning and wireless communication.

== Education ==
Kuo received the BSEE degree from National Taiwan University in 1980 and the MSEE and PhD degrees from Massachusetts Institute of Technology in 1985 and 1987, respectively. From October 1987 to December 1988, he was Computational and Applied Mathematics Research Assistant Professor at University of California, Los Angeles. Since January 1989, he has been with University of Southern California.

== Research ==
Kuo's research interests lie in the areas of multimedia data compression, communication and networking, multimedia content analysis and modeling, and information forensics and security. His research has attracted about 36,000 citations. He has published 14 books, contributed 11 book chapters, over 280 journal papers, 940 conference papers. His research projects have been funded by more than 70 industrial companies Kuo has guided 150 students to their Ph.D. degrees. He ranks as the top advisor in the Mathematics Genealogy Project in terms of the number of supervised PhD students. Currently, his research group at USC has around 20 Ph.D. students.

== Awards ==
Kuo is an ACM Fellow (elected 2022); a fellow of the American Association for the Advancement of Science (elected 2011); of the Institute of Electrical and Electronics Engineers (elected 1999); and of the International Society for Optical Engineering (elected 1996).

In his early academic career, Kuo received 1992 National Science Foundation Young Investigator (NYI) Award and 1993 National Science Foundation Presidential Faculty Fellow (PFF) Award.

Kuo has received numerous awards for his research contributions, including 2010 Electronic Imaging Scientist of the Year Award, 2010-11 Fulbright-Nokia Distinguished Chair in Information and Communications Technologies, 2019 IEEE Computer Society Edward J. McCluskey Technical Achievement Award, 2019 IEEE Signal Processing Society Claude Shannon-Harry Nyquist Technical Achievement Award, and 2020 IEEE TCMC Impact Award.

Kuo's educational achievements have received a wide array of recognitions such as the 2014 USC Northrop Grumman Excellence in Teaching Award, 2016 USC Associates Award for Excellence in Teaching, 2016 IEEE Computer Society Taylor L. Booth Education Award, 2016 IEEE Circuits and Systems Society John Choma Education Award, 2016 IS&T Raymond C. Bowman Award, 2017 IEEE Leon K. Kirchmayer Graduate Teaching Award, 2017 IEEE Signal Processing Society Carl Friedrich Gauss Education Award, and 2018 USC Provost's Mentoring Award.

In 2022 he was elected to the Academia Sinica.

== Services ==
Kuo was director for the Signal and Image Processing Institute at the University of Southern California from 2006 to 2012. He was the Editor-in-Chief for the IEEE Transactions on Information Forensics and Security from 2012 to 2014. He was President of Asia Pacific Signal and Information Processing Association (APSIPA) from 2013 to 2014.
