= Vincent Lepetit =

French computer scientist

- Citizenship: French
- Occupation: Computer scientist
- Awards: senior member of the Institut Universitaire de France

Academic background
- Education: PhD in Computer Vision
- Alma mater: University of Nancy

Academic work
- Institutions: École des Ponts ParisTech, University of Bordeaux, TU Graz, École Polytechnique Fédérale de Lausanne
- Main interests: Machine Learning and 3D Computer Vision

Vincent Lepetit is a French computer scientist, professor at the Ecole des Ponts ParisTech. He received his PhD degree in computer vision in 2001 from the University of Nancy.

Lepetit leads a research group in computer vision for augmented reality at the Institute for Computer Graphics and Vision, TU Graz. He was formerly professor at the Institute for Computer Graphics and Vision at the same institution from February 2014 to December 2016. He is a senior member of the Institut Universitaire de France.

Lepetit's research interests include machine learning and 3D computer vision.

== Selected research ==
- Calonder, Michael, et al. "Brief: Binary robust independent elementary features." European conference on computer vision. Springer, Berlin, Heidelberg, 2010.
- Lepetit, Vincent, Francesc Moreno-Noguer, and Pascal Fua. "Epnp: An accurate o (n) solution to the pnp problem." International journal of computer vision 81.2 (2009): 155.
- Tola, Engin, Vincent Lepetit, and Pascal Fua. "Daisy: An efficient dense descriptor applied to wide-baseline stereo." IEEE transactions on pattern analysis and machine intelligence 32.5 (2009): 815–830.
- Lepetit, Vincent, and Pascal Fua. "Keypoint recognition using randomized trees." IEEE transactions on pattern analysis and machine intelligence 28.9 (2006): 1465–1479.
