= Thomas Allen (scholar) =

English clergyman and divine

Thomas Allen (1681–1755) was an English clergyman and divine.

== Life ==
Allen was born in Oxford 25 December 1681, and educated at New College School and Wadham College, Oxford, where he took the degree of B.A. on 2 July 1705. He was for a time a clerk in Lincoln's Inn; then became a schoolmaster; was ordained in 1705; in February 1706 he became vicar of Irchester, Northamptonshire, which he resigned in 1715 to take the less valuable rectory of Kettering. He married Dorothy Plowman, who, disliking the exchange of livings, murdered her infant son and cut her own throat, but recovered, and was tried and acquitted at the next assizes. Allen died, while reading prayers, 31 May 1755.

== Works ==
He was the author of various religious writings. 'The Practice of a Holy Life, or the Christian's Daily Exercise,' 1716, a collection of prayers and meditations, is his chief work. He is also the author of an 'Apology for the Church of England, and Vindication of her Learned Clergy' (1725), in reply to Thomas Woolston's pamphlet on 'the hireling priests of this age,' and of a sermon preached at Newgate Prison in 1744 to twenty-one condemned criminals, and published at the request of the congregation; of the 'Way to grow Rich' (about 1753); a sermon with a preface and essay, recommending the payment of tithes, and reprobating the enclosure of commons; and of 'The New Birth; or Christian Regeneration, being the marrow of Christian Theology, expressed in blank or Miltonian verse,' &c. A preface states that the design of these verses is 'no less than regenerating the whole British nation,' and expresses the opinion that all who have John Milton's poem Paradise Regained 'would do well to furnish themselves with this little piece, which compleats, or rather realizeth, his design.' According to an advertisement appended to his 'Apology for the Church of England,'

Allen had already published in 1725, or was just about to publish, a Greek grammar, entitled 'English and Greek Institutions for the more easy attaining the Knowledge of the Greek Language;' a 'Greek and English Dictionary;' 'Practical Christianity; or the whole Will of God and Duty of Man methodically laid down according to both the Testaments or Covenants;' and 'An Explanation of the Seven Words of the Lord Jesus to the Seven Churches of Asia,' which the writer describes as a 'practical piece.' But none of these books appear to have survived.
