= Shahriar Negahdaripour =

Shahriar Negahdaripour from the University of Miami, Coral Gables, Florida was named Fellow of the Institute of Electrical and Electronics Engineers (IEEE) in 2012 for contributions to underwater computer vision.
