= Henry Bright (schoolmaster, born 1724) =

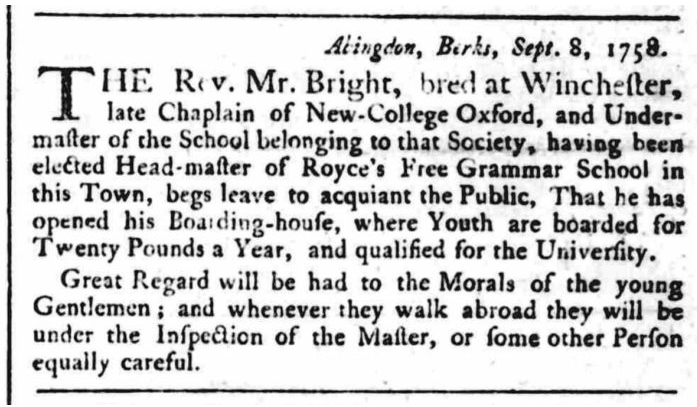
- Reverend Henry Bright advertises the opening of his boarding house on 8 September 1758.
- Born: 1724
- Died: 31 January 1803 (aged 78); Oxford
- Education: Winchester College
- Alma mater: Trinity College, Oxford; New College, Oxford
- Occupation(s): Clergyman, schoolmaster
- Employer(s): Abingdon School (1758–1774); New College School (1774–1794)

Ecclesiastical career
- Religion: Church of England
- Ordained: June 1747 (deacon); March 1748 (priest)

Henry Bright (1724 – 31 January 1803) was an English clergyman, academic, and schoolmaster, who served as headmaster of Abingdon School (1758–1774) and New College School (1774–1794).

== Biography ==
Bright was the son of Rowland Bright of Argeville, France (where the statesman Lord Bolingbroke was then living in retirement).

He was educated at Winchester College. He matriculated at Trinity College, Oxford in 1743, aged 19, and at New College, Oxford graduated BA (1747) and MA (1761). Ordained deacon in June 1747 and priest in March 1748, he became a Fellow and chaplain at New College, and under-master at New College School.

He was headmaster of Roysse's Free School in Abingdon (now Abingdon School) from 27 July 1758 to 1774. In 1758 Bright advertised the opening of his student boarding house, one of several adverts that he posted in Jackson's Oxford Journal. In 1763, to celebrate the school's bi-centenary, Bright commissioned a wooden panel painted with a coat of arms (the arms of founder John Roysse impaled on an unknown quartered shield) and the motto Misericordias Domini in Aeternum Cantabo (I will sing of the Lord's mercies forever), the opening line of Psalm 89. Though the coat of arms is no longer in use, the school motto endures.

Bright left Abingdon when appointed headmaster of New College School, Oxford in 1774, continuing until 1794. His tenure coincided with that of Philip Hayes as organist. According to Matthew Jenkinson, this was a high-point in the school's history, the school having good-quality academic and music teachers, and the choir enjoying a high reputation.

He was the author of Praxis, a Latin and English textbook for schools published in 1783.

He held the following church livings:

- Preacher at St Helen's Church, Abingdon and Marcham, Berkshire (1758)
- Curate of Waldron, Sussex (1758)
- Vicar of Denchworth, Berkshire (1775)
- Vicar of Chittlehampton, Devon (1794)
- Rector of Bicton, Devon (1797–1803)

Having been in ill health for several years previously, he died on 31 January 1803 at his home in Oxford.
