= International Conference on Computer Vision =

Computer-vision research conference

- Abbreviation: ICCV
- Discipline: Computer Vision

Publication details
- Publisher: IEEE
- History: 1987–present
- Frequency: Biennial

The International Conference on Computer Vision (ICCV) is a research conference sponsored by the Institute of Electrical and Electronics Engineers (IEEE) held every other year. It is considered to be one of the top conferences in computer vision, alongside CVPR and ECCV, and it is held on years in which ECCV is not.

The conference is usually spread over four to five days. Typically, experts in the focus areas give tutorial talks on the first day, then the technical sessions (and poster sessions in parallel) follow. Recent conferences have also had an increasing number of focused workshops and a commercial exhibition.

== Awards ==
=== Azriel Rosenfeld Lifetime Achievement Award ===
The Azriel Rosenfeld Award, or Azriel Rosenfeld Lifetime Achievement Award, recognizes researchers who have made significant contributions to the field of computer vision over their careers. It is named in memory of computer scientist and mathematician Azriel Rosenfeld. The following people have received this award:

Year	Winner(s)
2023	Edward Adelson
2021	Ruzena Bajcsy
2019	Shimon Ullman
2017	Tomaso Poggio
2015	Olivier Faugeras
2013	Jan Koenderink
2011	Thomas Huang
2009	Berthold K.P. Horn
2007	Takeo Kanade

=== Helmholtz Prize ===
The ICCV Helmholtz Prize, known as the Test of Time Award before 2013, is awarded every other year at the ICCV, recognizing ICCV papers from ten or more years earlier that had a significant impact on computer vision research. Winners are selected by the IEEE Computer Society's Technical Committee on Pattern Analysis and Machine Intelligence. The award is named after the 19th century physician and physicist Hermann von Helmholtz, and the ICCV's award is not related to the various Helmholtz Prizes in physics, or the Hermann von Helmholtz Prize in neuroscience.

=== Marr Prize ===
The ICCV best-paper award is the Marr Prize, named after British neuroscientist David Marr.

=== Mark Everingham Prize ===
The Mark Everingham Prize is an award given yearly by the Technical Committee on Pattern Analysis and Machine Intelligence of the IEEE Computer Society at the IEEE International Conference on Computer Vision or the European Conference on Computer Vision to commemorate the late Mark Everingham, "one of the rising stars of computer vision", and to encourage others to follow in his footsteps by acting to further progress in the computer vision community as a whole. The prize is given to a researcher, or a team of researchers, who have made a selfless contribution of significant benefit to other members of the computer vision community. The Mark Everingham Prize for Rigorous Evaluation was an award given in 2012 at the British Machine Vision Conference.

=== PAMI Distinguished Researcher Award ===
The PAMI Distinguished Researcher Award (until 2013 called Significant Researcher Award) is awarded to candidates whose research projects have significantly contributed to the progress of computer vision. Awards are made based on major research contributions, as well as the role of those contributions in influencing and inspiring other research. Candidates are nominated by the community. The following people have received this award:

Year	Winner(s)
2023	Michael Black, Rama Chellappa
2021	Pietro Perona, Cordelia Schmid
2019	William T. Freeman, Shree Nayar
2017	Luc van Gool, Richard Szeliski
2015	Yann LeCun, David Lowe
2013	Jitendra Malik, Andrew Zisserman
2011	Katsushi Ikeuchi, Richard Hartley
2009	Andrew Blake
2007	Demetri Terzopoulos

== Conference list ==
The conference is usually held in the Spring in various international locations.

Year	Location
2025	Honolulu, Hawaii
2023	Paris, France
2021	~~Montreal, Canada~~ Online due to COVID-19
2019	Seoul, Korea
2017	Venice, Italy
2015	Santiago, Chile
2013	Sydney, Australia
2011	Barcelona, Spain
2009	Kyoto, Japan
2007	Rio de Janeiro, Brazil
2005	Beijing, China
2003	Nice, France
2001	Vancouver, Canada
1999	Corfu, Greece
1998	Mumbai, India
1995	Boston, Massachusetts
1993	Berlin, Germany
1990	Osaka, Japan
1988	Tampa, Florida
1987	London, United Kingdom

== See also ==
- Computer Vision and Pattern Recognition
- European Conference on Computer Vision
