= Joseph Mundy =

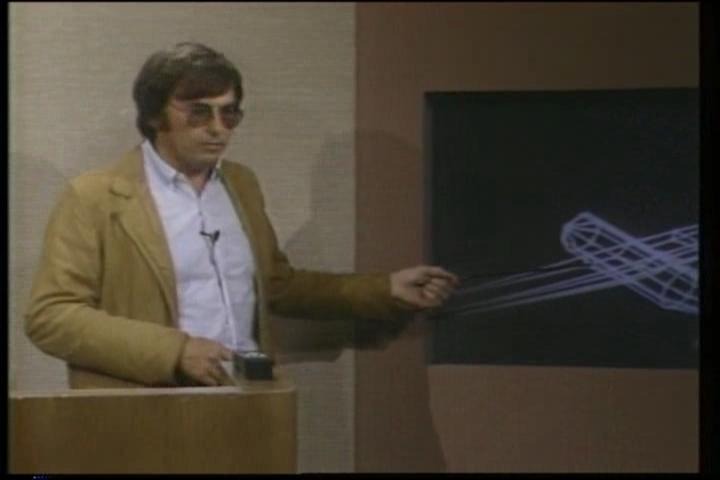
Joseph Mundy in a University Video Communication about Model-Based Computer Vision

Joseph Mundy did early work in computer vision and projective geometry using LISP, when computer vision still was a new area of research. In 1987 he presented his work in a video, which now is available for free at archive.org.

Here is an extract of the interview, which took place in the end of the video.

"What do students need to learn to be prepared to meet the challenges?" -

"I would like to comment on the necessary courses a student should take to really be prepared to carry out research in model-based vision. As we can see the geometry of image projection and the mathematics of transformation is a very key element in studying this field, but there are many other issues the student has to be prepared for. If we are going to talk about segmenting images and getting good geometric clues, we have to understand the relationship between the intensity of image data and its underlying geometry. And this would lead the student into such areas as optics, illumination theory, theory of shadows and the like. And also the mathematics underlying this kind of computations would of course require signal processing theory, fourier transform theory and the like. And in dealing with algebraic surfaces such as this curved surfaces as we talked about here, courses in algebraic geometry and higher pure forms of algebra will prove to be necessary in order to make any kind of progress in research to handle curved surfaces. So, I guess the bottom line of what I'm saying is: math courses, particularly those associated with geometric aspects will be key in all of this."

== See also ==
- Computer Vision
