= Thomas Huang =

Chinese-American engineer and computer scientist (1936–2020)

- 黃煦濤
- Huang in the early 2000s
- Born: Thomas Shi-Tao Huang; June 26, 1936; Shanghai, Republic of China
- Died: April 25, 2020 (aged 83); Fort Wayne, Indiana, U.S.
- Citizenship: American
- Education: National Taiwan University (BS); Massachusetts Institute of Technology (MS, DSc)
- Scientific career
- Fields: Computer science
- Workplaces: Massachusetts Institute of Technology; Purdue University; University of Illinois Urbana-Champaign
- Thesis: Pictorial noise (1963)
- Doctoral advisor: William F. Schreiber

Thomas Shi-Tao Huang (traditional Chinese: 黃煦濤; simplified Chinese: 黄煦涛; pinyin: Huáng Xùtāo, June 26, 1936 – April 25, 2020) was a Chinese-born Taiwanese-American computer scientist and electrical engineer. He was a researcher and professor emeritus at the University of Illinois at Urbana-Champaign (UIUC). Huang was one of the leading figures in computer vision, pattern recognition and human computer interaction.

== Early life and education ==
Huang was born June 26, 1936, in Shanghai, Republic of China. In 1949, his family moved to Taiwan during the Great Retreat. Huang studied electronics at the National Taiwan University and received his bachelor's degree in 1956.

Huang went on to the United States to study at the Massachusetts Institute of Technology (MIT). At MIT he worked initially with Peter Elias, who was interested in information theory and image coding, and then with William F. Schreiber. At that time scanning equipment was not commercially available, so it was necessary to build a scanner for digitizing and reproducing images. Computer programs were written in assembly language using a prototype Lincoln Lab TX-0 computer. Descriptions of digitized images were stored on paper tape with punched holes. Huang was supervised by Schreiber for both his M.S. thesis, Picture statistics and linearly interpolative coding (1960), and his Sc.D. thesis, Pictorial noise (1963). His master's work focused on algorithms for image coding using adaptive techniques for interpolation with sensitivity to edges. His doctorate included work on the subjective effects of pictorial noise across a spectrum.

== Career ==
Huang accepted a position on the faculty of the Department of Electrical Engineering at MIT, and remained there from 1963 to 1973. He accepted a position as an electrical engineering professor and director of the Information and Signal Processing Laboratory at Purdue University in 1973, remaining there until 1980.

In 1980 Huang accepted a chair in electrical engineering at the University of Illinois at Urbana-Champaign (UIUC). On April 15, 1996, Huang became the first William L. Everitt Distinguished Professor in Electrical & Computer Engineering at UIUC. He was involved with the Coordinated Science Laboratory (CSL), and served as head of the Image Formation and Processing Group of the Beckman Institute for Advanced Science and Technology and co-chair of the Beckman Institute's research track on Human Computer Intelligent Interaction. As of 2012, he was named a Swanlund Chair, the highest endowed title at UIUC. Huang retired from teaching as of December 2014, but continued to be active as a researcher.

Huang was a founding editor of the International Journal of Computer Vision, Graphics and Image Processing, and of Springer-Verlag's Springer Series in Information Sciences. He helped to organize the first International Picture Coding Symposium (1969), the first International Workshop on Very Low Bitrate Video Coding (1993), and the first International Conference on Automatic Face and Gesture Recognition (1995), all of which became repeated events.

== Research ==
Huang's research tended to focus on the development of general concepts, methodologies, theories, and algorithms which have wide application to multimodal and multimedia signal processing. While still at MIT, he developed the first algebraic procedure for testing the stability conditions of two-dimensional filters, based on double bilinear transformation and the Ansell method. He also published on digital holography. While at Purdue, he worked on nonlinear filters, particularly median filters, which became a standard technique for the removal of noise in images.

Some of his earliest work dealt with image compression, extending later into areas of enhancement, restoration and analysis. He developed approaches for binary document compression that utilized 2-dimensional scanned information, examining the changes from one line of a scan to the next, and detecting transition points at which a subsequent line differs. Statistical predictions and experimental results of the model's performance conformed well. In 1969, Huang and Grant Anderson were one of the first teams to propose a method for block transform coding, building on the work of J. J. Y. Huang and Peter M. Schultheiss.

In 1984, Tsai and Huang were the first to present a frequency-domain multi-frame method which related the discrete Fourier transform of observed low-resolution satellite images from the acquisition stage to the continuous Fourier transform of the high-resolution image, using the inverse Fourier transform to obtain a final image with increased resolution. Huang also worked on wavelet methods of encoding and on fractal coding. Wavelet coding is particularly important for content based image retrieval from multimedia databases containing images, video, audio, and text. It enables searches to be done on smaller encoded images rather than on full-size retrieved images. Other research areas of importance include the use of relevance feedback in adapting database systems to user intentions (when browsing or searching), and constructing tables of contents and semantic indexes for video using multimedia information (image sequence, audio, and closed-captions if available).

In the area of 3-D modelling, Huang worked on the identification of three-dimensional motion and the structure of rigid objects given multiple images in which corresponding features can be identified. This work was important for the compression of television images, for the development of image standards, and for research into human and computer vision. Huang also worked on the 3-D modeling, analysis, and synthesis of images of the human face, hands, and body. The initial motivation behind this research was to support low bitrate 3-D model-based video coding for video phone and teleconferencing. The idea was that if a 3-D model of the user could be transmitted and reconstructed at the receiving end, it would then be sufficient to extract and send movement information to drive the 3-D model and regenerate the video sequence. Tools developed for this type of scenarios are applicable to many other problems as well, including virtual space conferencing with avatars, and electronic games.

Huang considered image and speech processing to be fundamentally similar, and worked with speech recognition and sound processing as well as images. Huang, Mark Hasegawa-Johnson, and their students created a database of speech, recorded in automobiles, that is usable as a benchmark for testing audio-visual speech recognition algorithms. They also developed methods for detecting audio elements that are likely to attract human attention, and are using them to enable humans to more effectively go through large amounts of audio recordings to find important information.

Huang did important work in multimodal human computer interaction and interface design. He was one of the first researchers to combine audio and video-based techniques for identification of human affective states. More recent work by Huang and others attempts to "develop a series of algorithms to extract information from multi-modality in an optimal way", screening large amounts of data from multiple sources and optimizing the types and amounts of data that are compressed and transmitted. Such opportunistic sensing research has applications in both military and civilian use.

Huang also hoped to develop more natural and effective ways for humans to interact with a computer or virtual environment using speech and gesture. Research projects include visual hand tracking and gesture recognition; the use of visual lip reading to enhance audio speech recognition accuracy; and integration of speech recognition and visual gesture analysis in the controlling of displays in virtual environments.

He also worked on audio-visual recognition of gender, age group, and emotion. His work in gender and emotion detection received media attention when his software was used to examine the Mona Lisa, concluding that the portrait was of a female (not, as some had theorized, based on Da Vinci himself) and that her enigmatic smile was more happy than sad.

In 2015, Huang worked with Ann Willemsen-Dunlap in an interdisciplinary project to develop a 3-D computer-generated avatar, capable of showing appropriate emotions, to be used in online communication of medical information to patients.

He also explored the use of high-performance computing and big data to develop better techniques for deep learning. One of the tasks being studied, not surprisingly, is face recognition. In another project, his team is working with astronomer Robert Brunner to train a feedforward neural network to identify images of galaxies.

== Published work ==
As of 2010 Huang had published more than 21 books and been an author on more than 600 papers. Representative publications by Thomas Huang include:

- Qi, G. J., Aggarwal, C., Tian, Q., Ji, H., Huang, T. S. (2012), "Exploring Context and Content Links in Social Media: A Latent Space Method", IEEE Transactions on Pattern Analysis and Machine Intelligence, pp. 850–862.
- Jaimes, A., Gatica-Perez, D., Sebe, N., Huang, T.S. (2007), "Human-centered Computing: Toward a Human Revolution", IEEE Computer, 40(5), pp. 30–34.
- Cohen, I., Cozman, F., Sebe, N., Cirelo, M., Huang, T.S. (2004), "Semi-supervised Learning of Classifiers: Theory, Algorithms and Their Applications to Human-Computer Interaction", IEEE Transactions on Pattern Analysis and Machine Intelligence, 26(12), pp. 1553–1567.
- Pan, H., Levinson, S.E., Huang, T.S., and Liang, Z.P. (2004), "A Fused HMM Model with Application to Bimodal Speech Processing," IEEE Transactions On Signal Processing, 52/3, pp. 573– 581.
- Zhou, X.S. and Huang, T.S. (2003), "Relevance Feedback in Image Retrieval: A Comprehensive Review," ACM Multimedia Systems Journal, pp. 536–544.
- Bruckstein, A.M., Holt, R.J., Huang, T.S., and Netravali, A.N. (2000), "New Devices for 3D Pose Estimation: Mantis Eyes, Agam Paintings, Sundials, and Other Space Fiducials," International Journal of Computer Vision, pp. 131–139.
- Rui, Yong; Huang, Thomas S.; Chang, Shih-Fu (1999). "Image Retrieval: Current Techniques, Promising Directions, and Open Issues" (PDF). Journal of Visual Communication and Image Representation. 10: 39–62. doi:10.1006/jvci.1999.0413. S2CID 2910032. – This paper received the Most Cited Paper of the Decade Award from the Journal of Visual Communication and Image Representation, 2010
- Lew, M.S., Wong, K., and Huang, T.S. (1994), "Learning and Feature Selection in Stereo Matching," IEEE Transactions on Pattern Analysis and Machine Intelligence, pp. 869–881.
- Arun, K., Huang, T.S., and Blostein, S.D. (1987), "Least-Squares Fitting of Two 3-D Point Sets, IEEE Transactions on Pattern Analysis and Machine Intelligence, pp. 698–700.
- R. Y. Tsai and T.S. Huang, (1984) "Uniqueness and estimation of three-dimensional motion parameters of rigid objects with curved surfaces" IEEE Transactions on Pattern Analysis and Machine Intelligence, pp. 13–27.

== Personal life ==
Huang was married to Margaret, who preceded him in death by three months. They married in 1959.

Huang died peacefully in Indiana on April 25, 2020, at the age of 83.

The couple had four children: Caroline, Greg, Tom and Marjorie.

== Honors ==
Huang received numerous honors and awards in his career, including:

=== Memberships ===
- Member, Academia Sinica, 2008
- Foreign Member, Chinese Academy of Sciences, 2002
- Foreign Member, Chinese Academy of Engineering, 2001
- Member, United States National Academy of Engineering, 2001
- Fellow, Japan Society for the Promotion of Science, 1986
- Fellow, SPIE
- Fellow, International Association of Pattern Recognition (IAPR)
- Fellow, Optical Society of America, 1986
- Life Fellow, IEEE, 1979, for contributions to the theory and application of image processing and digital filtering.

=== Awards ===
- Azriel Rosenfeld Award, 2011
- HP Innovation Research Award, 2009
- Picture Coding Symposium: Pioneering Research in Picture Coding Award, 2006
- IS&T and SPIE Imaging Scientist of the Year Award, 2006
- Okawa Prize for Information and Telecommunications Technology, 2005
- Tau Beta Pi Daniel C. Drucker Eminent Faculty Award, 2005.
- Pan Wen-Yuan Outstanding Research Award, Pan Wen-Yuan Foundation, 2002
- King-Sun Fu Prize, International Association of Pattern Recognition (IAPR), 2002
- Information Science Award, Association of Intelligent Machinery, 2002
- IEEE Jack S. Kilby Signal Processing Medal, 2001 (together with Arun N. Netravali)
- IEEE Achievement Award for Contributions to Motion Analysis, 2000
- IEEE Third Millennium Medal, 2000
- Society Award, IEEE Signal Processing Society, 1991
- IEEE ASSP Society Technical Achievement Award, 1988
- A. V. Humboldt U.S. Senior Scientist Award, 1976–77
- Guggenheim Fellow, 1971–72

=== Awards Named ===
Huang supervised more than 100 graduate students. In 2012, the Thomas and Margaret Huang Fund for Graduate Research was created in response to appeals by former students James J. Kuch and Chang Wen Chen, to celebrate the contributions of Huang and his wife as mentors and teachers as well as his contributions as a researcher. The fund will provide scholarships to support students in Human-Computer Intelligent Interaction at the Beckman Institute.
