= Gijsje Koenderink =

Dutch biophysicist

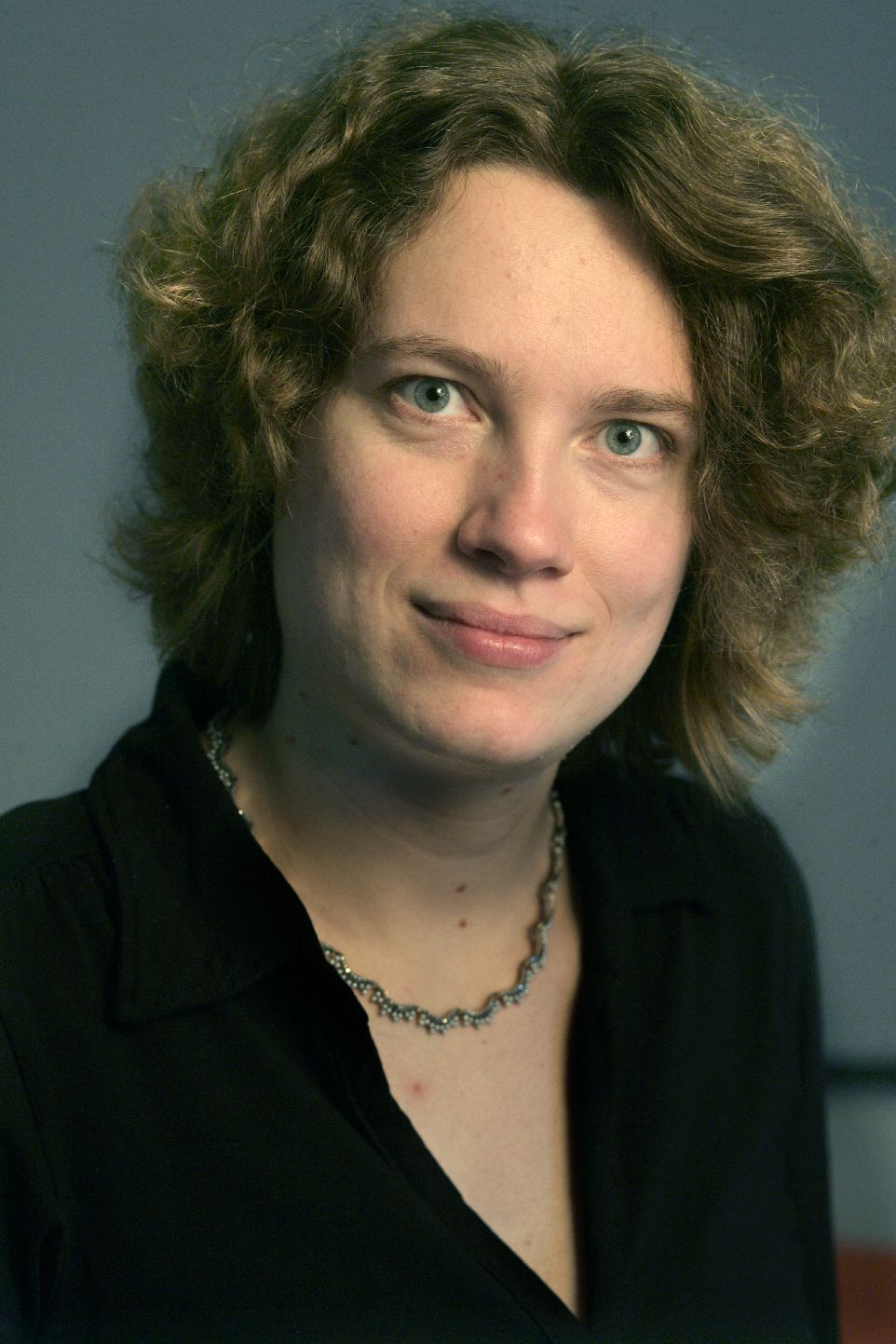
Koenderink in 2008

Gijsberta Hendrika (Gijsje) Koenderink (born 1974) is a Dutch biophysicist whose research investigates the biomechanics of cells and their substructures, and the use of lipids in nanobiotechnology. She is a professor in the Bionanoscience Department in the Delft University of Technology.

== Education and career ==
Koenderink earned a master's degree in physical chemistry at Utrecht University in 1998, and completed her Ph.D. there in 2003. After postdoctoral study at Vrije Universiteit Amsterdam and Harvard University, she worked for AMOLF, a research institute in Amsterdam, from 2006 to 2019, heading the Biological Soft Matter group and (beginning in 2014) the Living Matter Department there. She took her present position at the Delft University of Technology in 2019.

== Recognition ==
Koenderink was elected to the Young Academy of the Royal Netherlands Academy of Arts and Sciences (KNAW) in 2008. In 2021, TU Dresden and the Max Planck Institute for the Physics of Complex Systems gave Koenderink their Dresden Physics Prize. In 2024 Koenderink was elected a full member of the Royal Netherlands Academy of Arts and Sciences.
