= ACM Transactions on Applied Perception =

- Discipline: Computer Science; Psychology
- Language: English
- Edited by: Bobby Bodenheimer

Publication details
- History: 2004-Present
- Publisher: Association for Computing Machinery
- Frequency: Quarterly
- Impact factor: 1.9 (2023)

Standard abbreviations
- ISO 4: ACM Trans. Appl. Percept.

Indexing
- ISSN: 1544-3558
- OCLC no.: 52051712

Links
- Journal homepage

ACM Transactions on Applied Perception (ACM TAP) is a quarterly peer-reviewed scientific journal covering interdisciplinary computer science topics relevant to psychology and perception. It was established in 2004 by Erik Reinhard and Heinrich Buelthoff and is published by the Association for Computing Machinery. In 2016, the ACM Publications Board agreed to offer journal publication to the strongest submissions to the ACM Symposium on Applied Perception.

The editor-in-chief is Bobby Bodenheimer from Vanderbilt University. According to the Journal Citation Reports, the journal had a 2023 impact factor of 1.9.
