= Jan Koenderink =

Dutch mathematician and psychologist (born 1943)

Jan Johan Koenderink (born 10 February 1943, Stramproy) is a Dutch physicist and psychologist known for his research in visual perception, computer vision, and geometry.

Koenderink earned a bachelor's degree from Utrecht University in 1964, a master's in 1967, and a Ph.D. in 1972 on a thesis titled Models of the visual system. He was a full professor of physics and astronomy at Utrecht University from 1978 until his mandatory retirement in 2008; since then, he has held fellow or visiting professor positions at Utrecht, the Delft University of Technology, the Massachusetts Institute of Technology, and Katholieke Universiteit Leuven.

Koenderink is the author of the books Color for the Sciences (MIT Press, 2010), on colorimetry, and Solid Shape (MIT Press, 1990), on differential geometry.

In 1987, the Katholieke Universiteit Leuven awarded Koenderink an honorary doctorate.

Koenderink became a fellow of the Royal Netherlands Academy of Arts and Sciences in 1990, and of the Royal Flemish Academy of Belgium for Science and the Arts in 2010.

Koenderink is the 2013 recipient of the Azriel Rosenfeld Award for lifetime achievement in computer vision.

In 2017, Koenderink, along with Andrea Van Doorn, was awarded the Kurt-Koffka medal from Justus Liebig University Giessen.
