= Rama Chellappa =

Professor of Electronics and Communication Engineering

Ramalingam "Rama" Chellappa
- Occupation: Professor

Academic background
- Education: Purdue University
- Thesis: Stochastic models in image analysis and processing (1981)
- Doctoral advisor: Rangasami L. Kashyap

Ramalingam "Rama" Chellappa is a Bloomberg Distinguished Professor at Johns Hopkins University. At Johns Hopkins University, he is a member of the Center for Language and Speech Processing, the Center for Imaging Science, the Institute for Assured Autonomy, and the Mathematical Institute for Data Sciences. He joined Johns Hopkins University after 29 years at The University of Maryland. Before that, he was an assistant, associate professor, and later, director, of the University of Southern California's Signal and Image Processing institute.

Chellappa was born near Chennai, in Southern India.

== Education ==
Chellappa received an MSEE and PhD of Electrical Engineering at Purdue University. He has a Master of Engineering (Distinction) of Electrical and Communication Engineering from The Indian Institute of Science (1977), and a Bachelor of Engineering (Honors) of Electrical and Communication Engineering from The University of Madras (1975).

== Career ==
During Chellappa's time at the University of Southern California, he worked at the Signal and Image Processing institute, as an assistant from 1981 to 1986, associate professor during 1986 to 1991, and director during 1988 to 1990.

During his time at The University of Maryland, Chellappa was a professor of The Department of Electrical and Computer Engineering and a Permanent Member of UMIACS, as well as an affiliate professor at The Department of Computer Science.

Chellappa currently works at Johns Hopkins University, and is researching artificial intelligence, facial recognition, machine learning, motion capture, and computer imaging.

== Awards and engineering society positions ==
He is a Life Fellow of IEEE, and a Fellow of AAAI, AAAS, ACM, AIMBE, IAPR, NAI and Optica. He has served as the President of the IEEE Biometrics Council, a distinguished lecturer of the IEEE Signal Processing Society, and holds 9 patents.

- IEEE Leon K. Kirchmayer Graduate Teaching Award (2027 recipient)
- IEEE Computer Society PAMI Azriel Rosenfeld Lifetime Achievement Award (2025 recipient)
- Induction into the Innovation Hall of Fame, A.J. Clark School of Engineering, UMD (2025)
- Edwin H. Land Medal (2024 recipient)
- Foreign Fellow, Indian National Academy of Engineering (2024)
- IEEE Computer Society PAMI Distinguished Researcher Award (2023 recipient)
- Washington Academy of Sciences (2023 Distinguished Career Award recipient)
- National Academy of Engineering (2023 Member)
- IEEE Jack S. Kilby Signal Processing Medal (2020 recipient)
- IEEE Signal Processing Society Award
- IEEE Signal Processing Society (Technical Achievement and Meritorious Service Awards)
- NSF Presidential Young Investigator Award
- IBM Faculty Development Award (4 in total)
- International Association for Pattern Recognition King-Sun Fu Prize Award, Best Paper Awards (2 in total)
- IEEE Computer Society Technical Achievement and Meritorious Service Awards
- Office of Technology Commercialization Outstanding Innovator Award

== Publications ==
Chellappa has published more than 750 peer-reviewed articles in top journals. He has an h-index of 143.

- Pubmed citations
- Google Scholar citations

=== Books ===
- Can We Trust AI?, Johns Hopkins University Press 2022

=== Highly Cited Articles ===
- 2003, W Zhao, R Chellappa, PJ Phillips, A Rosenfeld, Face Recognition: A Literature Survey, in ACM Computing Surveys (CSUR). Vol. 35 nº4, 399-458.
- 1995, R Chellappa, CL Wilson, S Sirohey, Human and Machine Recognition of Faces: A Survey, in Proceedings of the IEEE. Vol. 83, nº5, 705-741.
- 2008, P Turaga, R Chellappa, VS Subrahmanian, O Udrea, Machine Recognition of Human Activities: A Survey, in IEEE Transactions on Circuits and Systems for Video Technology. Vol. 18 nº11, 1473-1488.
- 1997, K Etemad, R Chellappa, Discriminant Analysis for Recognition of Human Face Images, in Journal of the Optical Society of America. Vol. 14 nº8, 1724-1733.
