= Advanced television =

Television features enabled by digital technology

Advanced television is an array of features enabled by digital technology that significantly changes analog television.

In 1996, David Weiss defined "advanced television" in his book, Issues in Advanced Television Technology to describe "an agglomeration of techniques, based largely on digital signal processing and transmission, that permits far more program material to be carried through channels than existing analog systems can manage."

== Features ==
Advanced television can be characterized by four features: time shifting, addressability, interactivity and interoperability.

- Time shifting allows the audience to control when content will be seen. Digital video recorders (DVRs) and video on demand (VOD) are two technologies that enable time shifting of television programming. In the US at year-end 2008, 29.8 million (27% of TV households) were DVR subscribers and 41.7 million households (37% of total TV households) were VOD enabled.
- Addressability allows the advertisers to direct messages to different segments of the audience; the audience can also self select (address to self) the content and commercial messages they receive. Segmentation can occur at geographic, demographic, behavioral and (in some cases) self-selected individual household levels.
- Interactivity empowers the audience to respond to or bypass content; the advertiser and media can benefit financially from measuring audience response. Now television commercials can enable audience response to a variety of offers using the standard remote. The same response mechanisms that can be used to ask the audience for information or transactional responses can serve as the basis for consumer database marketing. And with that, it becomes natural for media advertising, relationship marketing, and promotion to converge.
- Interoperability means that the same program and commercial content viewed using a television receiver can cross platforms and be viewed across a multiplicity of platforms/appliances, not just the TV, but also the PC, the mobile handset, the iPod, etc. From a technical standpoint, interoperability between media platforms "requires that all the media has to adopt the same fundamental compression scheme."

In his Advanced TV Advertising Forecast, Brian Wieser, Certified Financial Analyst formerly Global Forecasting for Interpublic Group's Magna, holds that Advanced TV advertising includes: "Video on Demand (VOD), requests for information (RFIs), long-form showcases, DVR advertising, interactive program guide advertising, addressable advertising, creative versioning and advanced trafficking systems." Advanced TV advertising can also be broadened to include digital incentive requests and direct response transactions.

Advertiser demands for accountability require new measurements of advertising effectiveness that differ from the "exposure" measurements now so prevalent for determining media cost and efficiencies. Exposure measurements still have a significant role to play in both pricing and efficiency analyses; but exposure will be a first level of measurement: creating the initial opportunity to generate demand. The concept of exposure will now have to be expanded from real time to include time-shifted and cross platform exposure. The second level of measurement for media pricing and efficiency will be for delivery of additional information. In some ways, this parallels the internet click through model. Here we measure and compensate the media for delivery of additional commercial content based on the requests of the audience. The third level of measurement is transactional.

At this level, we measure response and compensate the media for assisting in generating the desired response:

1. opting-in for more information by media or personal delivery

2. redemption of a promotional offer

3. taking a specified action

To satisfy marketer's need for accountability , the generation of media measurement will be a multilevel hybrid of the disparate metrics currently used across advertising, direct response, and digital media.

Since the technology to deliver Advanced Television has been extant for over ten years, the current broadcasting business model must be inhibiting the broadscale introduction of Advanced Television. The power players on the selling side: the content developers, the cable and broadcast networks, and the cable, satellite and telecommunications distribution companies have stymied innovation because they are wrestling over how to divide new revenues from time shifting, addressability/targeting, and interactive applications. The power players on the buying side: the media agents who can pool the interests and experiences of their marketer clients have a "wait and see" mindset until more conclusive evidence of effectiveness can be presented. Sponsors and their agencies might break the logjam by making upfront investments in experimenting with Advanced Television and with new programming that delivers value to the audiences that marketers seek to motivate and activate.

With a decrease in ad budgets during the Great Recession, cable companies increased efforts to mimic internet advertising, in part by offering a way to target ads at selected groups of consumers. "The industry has struggled so far to establish efficient ways to buy Advanced TV on a meaningful scale. Advanced TV is challenged by the fragmented nature of the cable and satellite industry's advertising infrastructure. This produces a chicken-and-egg problem of limited media investment without better infrastructure and content, but limited infrastructure and content without more media investment," according to Brian Wieser. Industry participants are hopeful that Canoe Ventures, a consortium funded and organized by the industry's largest cable operators to aggregate inventory/infrastructure, can catalyze the sector. Canoe faces meaningful challenges in coordinating technical, sales and operational staff across thousands of varying units of infrastructure. Armed with hundreds of millions of dollars from the six largest cable operators (Comcast, Time Warner, Cox, Cablevision, Charter and Brighthouse), Canoe is in the process of rolling out a scaled down version of its first ad-targeting product, called community addressable messaging. The technology will allow advertisers to select cable households within particular areas that have demographic factors, such as income, in common.

== See also ==
- Interactive television
- Addressable advertising
- Targeted advertising
- Digital television transition
