= Paradigms of AI Programming =

1992 book by Peter Norvig

Paradigms of AI Programming: Case Studies in Common Lisp
- Author: Peter Norvig
- Language: English
- Subject: artificial intelligence programming using Common Lisp
- Published: 1992
- ISBN: 1-55860-191-0

Paradigms of AI Programming: Case Studies in Common Lisp (ISBN 1-55860-191-0) is a well-known programming book by Peter Norvig about artificial intelligence programming using Common Lisp.

== History ==
The Lisp programming language has survived since 1958 as a primary language for artificial intelligence research. This text was published in 1992 as the Common Lisp standard was becoming widely adopted. Norvig introduces Lisp programming in the context of classic AI programs, including General Problem Solver (GPS) from 1959, ELIZA: Dialog with a Machine, from 1966, and STUDENT: Solving Algebra Word Problems, from 1964. The book covers more recent AI programming techniques, including Logic Programming, Object-Oriented Programming, Knowledge Representation, Symbolic Mathematics and Expert Systems.

== See also ==
- Herbert A. Simon
- J. C. Shaw
- Allen Newell
- Daniel G. Bobrow
- Joseph Weizenbaum
