= IEEE Transactions on Pattern Analysis and Machine Intelligence =

- Discipline: Computer science
- Language: English
- Edited by: Kyoung Mu Lee

Publication details
- History: 1979–present
- Publisher: IEEE Computer Society
- Frequency: Monthly
- Impact factor: 20.8 (2023)

Standard abbreviations
- ISO 4: IEEE Trans. Pattern Anal. Mach. Intell.

Indexing
- CODEN: ITPIDJ
- ISSN: 0162-8828 (print); 1939-3539 (web)
- LCCN: 80640328
- OCLC no.: 4253074

Links
- Journal homepage; Online access

IEEE Transactions on Pattern Analysis and Machine Intelligence (sometimes abbreviated as IEEE PAMI or simply PAMI) is a monthly peer-reviewed scientific journal published by the IEEE Computer Society.

== Background ==
The journal covers research in computer vision and image understanding, pattern analysis and recognition, machine intelligence, machine learning, search techniques, document and handwriting analysis, medical image analysis, video and image sequence analysis, content-based retrieval of image and video, and face and gesture recognition. The editor-in-chief is Kyoung Mu Lee (Seoul National University). According to the Journal Citation Reports, the journal has a 2023 impact factor of 20.8.
