= Conference on Computer Vision and Pattern Recognition =

Annual conference

- Abbreviation: Conf. Comput. Vis. Pattern Recognit.
- Discipline: Computer vision

Publication details
- Publisher: IEEE
- History: 1985–present
- Frequency: Annual

The Conference on Computer Vision and Pattern Recognition is an annual conference on computer vision and pattern recognition.

== Affiliations ==
The conference was first held in 1983 in Washington, DC, organized by Takeo Kanade and Dana H. Ballard. From 1985 to 2010 it was sponsored by the IEEE Computer Society. In 2011 it was also co-sponsored by University of Colorado Colorado Springs. Since 2012 it has been co-sponsored by the IEEE Computer Society and the Computer Vision Foundation, which provides open access to the conference papers.

== Scope ==
The conference considers a wide range of topics related to computer vision and pattern recognition—basically any topic that is extracting structures or answers from images or video or applying mathematical methods to data to extract or recognize patterns. Common topics include object recognition, image segmentation, motion estimation, 3D reconstruction, and deep learning.

The conference generally has less than 30% acceptance rates for all papers and less than 5% for oral presentations. It is managed by a rotating group of volunteers who are chosen in a public election at the Pattern Analysis and Machine Intelligence-Technical Community (PAMI-TC) meeting four years before the meeting. The conference uses a multi-tier double-blind peer review process. The program chairs, who cannot submit papers, select area chairs who manage the reviewers for their subset of submissions.

== Location and time ==
The conference is usually held in June in North America.

Year	Location	No. of Registrations	Paper Submissions	Accepted Papers
2031	Seattle			
2030	Denver			
2029	Los Angeles			
2028	San Antonio			
2027	Seattle			
2026	Denver	12322	16092	4071 (25.30%)
2025	Nashville	9557	13008	2872 (22.08%)

== Awards ==
=== Best Paper Award ===
These awards are picked by committees delegated by the program chairs of the conference.

=== Longuet-Higgins Prize ===
The Longuet-Higgins Prize recognizes papers from ten years ago that have made a significant impact on computer vision research.

=== PAMI Young Researcher Award ===
The Pattern Analysis and Machine Intelligence Young Researcher Award is an award given by the Technical Committee on Pattern Analysis and Machine Intelligence of the IEEE Computer Society to a researcher within 7 years of completing their Ph.D. for outstanding early career research contributions. Candidates are nominated by the computer vision community, with winners selected by a committee of senior researchers in the field. This award was originally instituted in 2012 by the journal Image and Vision Computing, also presented at the conference, and the journal continues to sponsor the award.

=== PAMI Thomas S. Huang Memorial Prize ===
The Thomas Huang Memorial Prize was established at the 2020 conference and is awarded annually starting from 2021 to honor researchers who are recognized as examples in research, teaching/mentoring, and service to the computer vision community.

== See also ==
- International Conference on Computer Vision
- European Conference on Computer Vision
