= European Conference on Computer Vision =

Computer-vision conference held in even years

- Abbreviation: ECCV
- Discipline: Computer Vision

Publication details
- Publisher: Springer Science+Business Media
- History: 1990–present
- Frequency: Biennial

The European Conference on Computer Vision (ECCV) is a biennial research conference with the proceedings published by Springer Science+Business Media. Similar to ICCV in scope and quality, it is held those years which ICCV is not. It is considered to be one of the top conferences in computer vision, alongside CVPR and ICCV, with an 'A' rating from the Australian Ranking of ICT Conferences and an 'A1' rating from the Brazilian ministry of education. The acceptance rate for ECCV 2010 was 24.4% for posters and 3.3% for oral presentations.

Like other top computer vision conferences, ECCV has tutorial talks, technical sessions, and poster sessions. The conference is usually spread over five to six days with the main technical program occupying three days in the middle, and tutorial and workshops, focused on specific topics, being held in the beginning and at the end.

The ECCV presents the Koenderink Prize annually to recognize fundamental contributions in computer vision.

== Location ==
The conference is usually held in autumn in Europe.

Conference	Year	Location
19	2026	Malmö, Sweden
18	2024	Milan, Italy
17	2022	Tel Aviv, Israel
16	2020	~~Glasgow, United Kingdom~~ Virtual/Online
15	2018	Munich, Germany
14	2016	Amsterdam, the Netherlands
13	2014	Zürich, Switzerland
12	2012	Florence, Italy
11	2010	Crete, Greece
10	2008	Marseille, France
9	2006	Graz, Austria
8	2004	Prague, Czechia
7	2002	Copenhagen, Denmark
6	2000	Dublin, Ireland
7	1998	Freiburg, Germany
4	1996	Cambridge, England
3	1994	Stockholm, Sweden
2	1992	Santa Margherita Ligure, Italy
1	1990	Antibes, France

== See also ==
- Computer Vision and Pattern Recognition
- International Conference on Computer Vision
