= SilverPush =

Singaporean marketing technology company

Silverpush
- Screenshot
- Company type: Private
- Founded: September 2012
- Headquarters: Singapore
- Area served: India, Japan, Philippines, Indonesia, Thailand, South Africa, Egypt, Dubai, Malaysia, Vietnam, Tanzania, UK, US, Middle East
- Founder: Hitesh Chawla
- CEO: Hitesh Chawla
- Industry: Advertisement Technology
- Products: Mirrors, Mirrors Safe, Parallels
- Services: AI powered Video Intelligence solutions. Contextual video ad placement targeting and brand suitability platforms.
- Website: www.silverpush.co
- Current status: Online

Silverpush is a Singapore based marketing technology provider. It was founded in September 2012, by Hitesh Chawla. After starting push notification advertisement in 2013, it launched India's first DSP platform in 2014. The company is backed by IDG Ventures, Palaash Ventures, Fabrice Grinda, K.Ganesh, 500 Startups, M&S Partners and Freak Out Inc, Japan.

Silverpush's in-video context detection platform uses artificial intelligence and computer vision to identify in-video contexts, including logos, faces, objects, actions, and scenes. This informs contextual video ad placements in line with content users are actively engaging with. Its brand safety platform uses in-video context detection to contextually filter out harmful and irrelevant content. Offering brands, a suitable video environment, surpassing traditional measures like keywords blacklist, whitelisted channels and more.

== Products ==
- In April 2019, Silverpush introduced Parallels, an ad sync technology that syncs ads with physical events in real-time.
- In November 2019, SilverPush launched Mirrors, an artificial intelligence-driven technology that aims to deliver more relevant in-video ads by way of analysing what appears in the content. Mirrors does this using a context detection technology on videos being viewed online.
- In May 2020, Silverpush launched Mirrors Safe, an AI-powered brand suitability platform.

== Funding ==
In April 2014, SilverPush raised $1.5 million in funding to increase global reach.

In February 2019, SilverPush raised $5 million in Series B funding from FreakOut Holdings.

In November 2022, SilverPush raised $12 million in Series C funding.

== Privacy implications ==
The use of SilverPush to track users across multiple devices has privacy implications and allows for more detailed tracking of users. Data can be collected from multiple devices used by a single user and correlated to form a more accurate picture of the person being tracked.

In July 2014, TechCrunch reported that SilverPush was using "ultrasonic inaudible sounds" called "audio beacons" along with cookies to reliably track users across multiple devices and that devices with an app containing the SilverPush SDK are constantly listening for audio beacons.

In April 2015, SilverPush claimed 67 apps were using its code.

In October 2015, the Center for Democracy and Technology submitted comments to the Federal Trade Commission (FTC) regarding SilverPush's cross-device tracking technology.

In March 2016, the FTC issued warning letters to 12 app developers using SilverPush code in their apps. The FTC warned these developers that they may be violating the FTC Act if they state or imply that their apps are not tracking television viewing habits when they in fact are. Shortly after the FTC warning, SilverPush made an official statement that they are ending the Unique Audio Beacon service. However, as of 21 March 2016, SilverPush is still advertising Unique Audio Beacon on their website.

In November 2016, researchers from UCL, UCSB and PoliMI demonstrated the security and privacy implications of the ultrasound cross-device tracking (uXDT) technology used by SilverPush. The most notable of their attacks uses uXDT-enabled applications to deanonymize Tor users.

In May 2017 SilverPush technology was again the subject of research: "A team of researchers from the Brunswick Technical University in Germany discovered [234] Android apps that employ ultrasonic tracking beacons to track users and their nearby environment. Their research paper focused on the technology of ultrasound cross-device tracking (uXDT)."

== See also ==
- Air gap (networking)
- BadBIOS
- Near sound data transfer
- SlickLogin
- Cross-device tracking
