= Security switch =

Physical software-controlling switch

A security switch is a hardware device designed to protect computers, laptops, smartphones and similar devices from unauthorized access or operation, distinct from a virtual security switch which offers software protection. Security switches should be operated by an authorized user only; for this reason, it should be isolated from other devices, in order to prevent unauthorized access, and it should not be possible to bypass it, in order to prevent malicious manipulation.

The primary purpose of a security switch is to provide protection against surveillance, eavesdropping, malware, spyware, and theft of digital devices.

Unlike other protections or techniques, a security switch can provide protection even if security has already been breached, since it does not have any access from other components and is not accessible by software. It can additionally disconnect or block peripheral devices, and perform "man in the middle" operations.

A security switch can be used for human presence detection since it can only be initiated by a human operator. It can also be used as a firewall.

== Types ==
=== Hardware kill switch ===
A hardware kill switch (HKS) is a physical switch that cuts the signal or power line to the device or disable the chip running them.

== Examples ==
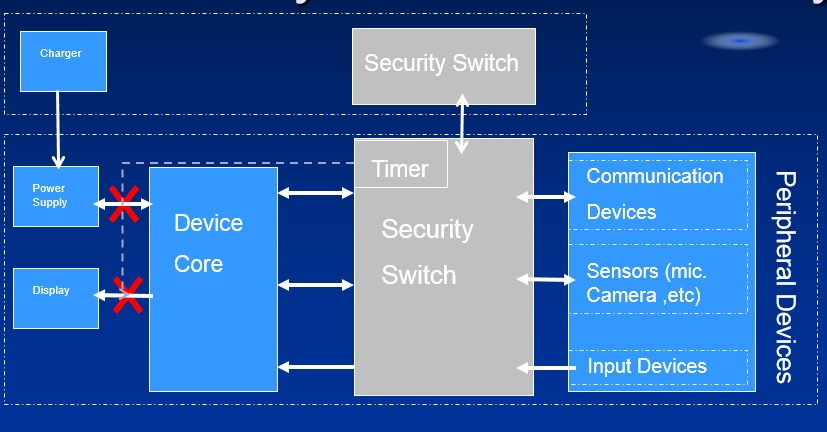
Inter-component communication pathways for an example device that uses a security switch

- A cellphone is compromised by malicious software, and the device initiates video and audio recording. When the user activates the “prevent capture of audio/video” mode of the security switch, that either physically disconnects or cut the power to the microphone and the camera, which stops the recording.
- A laptop that has an embedded security switch is stolen. The security switch detects a lack of communication from a specific external source for 12 hours, and responds by disconnecting the screen, keyboard and other key components, rendering the laptop useless, with no possibility of recovery, even with a full format.
- A user wishes to prevent tracking of their location. The user then activates geolocation protection and the security switch disables all GPS communication, eliminating the possibility of tracking the device's location.
- A user desires to eliminate the possibility of their PIN being copied from their smartphone. They can activate the secure input function, causing the security switch to disconnect the touch screen from the operating system, so input signals are not available to any devices except the switch.
- A security switch performs scheduled monitoring and finds that a program is attempting to download malicious content from the internet. It then activates internet security function and disables internet access, interrupting the download.
- If laptop software is compromised by air-gap malware, the user may activate the security switch and disconnect the speaker and microphone, so it can not establish communication with the device.

== History ==
Google started to work on a hardware kill switch for AI in 2016.

In 2019, Apple, and Google, along with a handful of smaller players, are designing “kill switches” that cut the power to the microphones or cameras in their devices. Googles first product that implemented this is Nest Hub Max.

Hardware kill switches are already available and widely tested on the PinePhone, Librem, Shiftphone, to cut power to the input peripherals (microphone, camera) but also the network connectivity modules (wifi, cellular network).

== See also ==
- Virtual security switch – Software Ethernet switch with embedded security controls
- Human presence detection – Technology for the detection of human bodies
- Air-gap malware – Type of malicious software
