= Pedestrian detection =

Computer technology

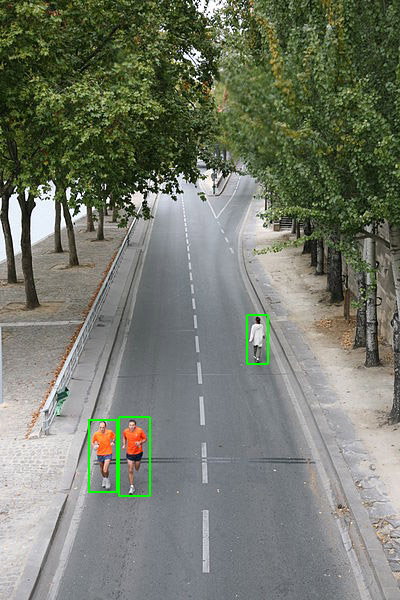
Pedestrian detection

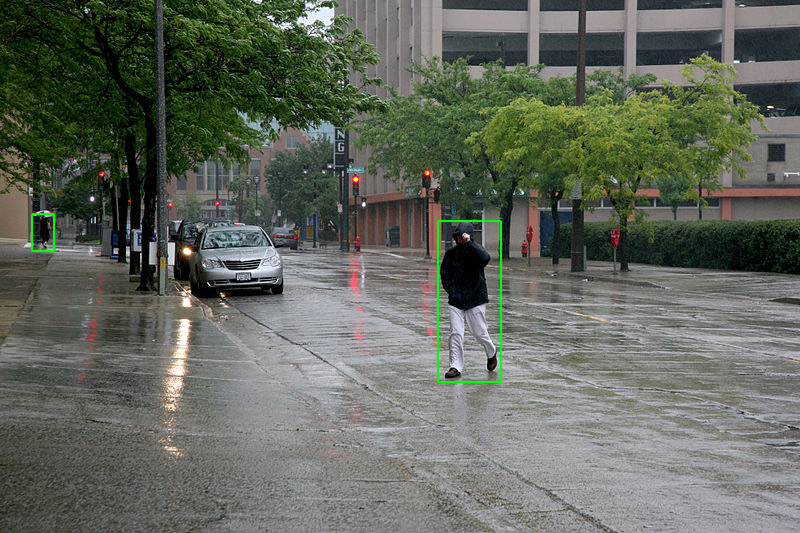
Pedestrian detection

Pedestrian detection is an essential and significant task in any intelligent video surveillance system, as it provides the fundamental information for semantic understanding of the video footages. It has an obvious extension to automotive applications due to the potential for improving safety systems. Many car manufacturers (e.g. Volvo, Ford, GM, Nissan) offer this as an ADAS option in 2017.

== Challenges ==
- Various style of clothing in appearance
- Different possible articulations
- The presence of occluding accessories
- Frequent occlusion between pedestrians

== Existing approaches ==
Despite the challenges, pedestrian detection still remains an active research area in computer vision in recent years. Numerous approaches have been proposed.

=== Holistic detection ===
Detectors are trained to search for pedestrians in the video frame by scanning the whole frame. The detector would “fire” if the image features inside the local search window meet certain criteria. Some methods employ global features such as edge template, others uses local features like histogram of oriented gradients descriptors. The drawback of this approach is that the performance can be easily affected by background clutter and occlusions.

=== Part-based detection ===
Pedestrians are modeled as collections of parts. Part hypotheses are firstly generated by learning local features, which include edgelet and orientation features. These part hypotheses are then joined to form the best assembly of existing pedestrian hypotheses. Though this approach is attractive, part detection itself is a difficult task. Implementation of this approach follows a standard procedure for processing the image data that consists of first creating a densely sampled image pyramid, computing features at each scale, performing classification at all possible locations, and finally performing non-maximal suppression to generate the final set of bounding boxes.

=== Patch-based detection ===
In 2005, Leibe et al. proposed an approach combining both the detection and segmentation with the name Implicit Shape Model (ISM). A codebook of local appearance is learned during the training process. In the detecting process, extracted local features are used to match against the codebook entries, and each match casts one vote for the pedestrian hypotheses. Final detection results can be obtained by further refining those hypotheses. The advantage of this approach is only a small number of training images are required.

=== Motion-based detection ===
When the conditions permit (fixed camera, stationary lighting conditions, etc.), background subtraction can help to detect pedestrians. Background subtraction classifies the pixels of video streams as either background, where no motion is detected, or foreground, where motion is detected. This procedure highlights the silhouettes (the connected components in the foreground) of every moving element in the scene, including people. An algorithm has been developed, at the university of Liège, to analyze the shape of these silhouettes in order to detect the humans. Since the methods that consider the silhouette as a whole and perform a single classification are, in general, highly sensitive to shape defects, a part-based method splitting the silhouettes in a set of smaller regions has been proposed to decrease the influence of defects. To the contrary of other part-based approaches, these regions do not have any anatomical meaning. This algorithm has been extended to the detection of humans in 3D video streams.

=== Detection using multiple cameras ===
Fleuret et al. suggested a method for integrating multiple calibrated cameras for detecting multiple pedestrians. In this approach, The ground plane is partitioned into uniform, non-overlapping grid cells, typically with size of 25 by 25 (cm). The detector produces a Probability Occupancy Map (POM), it provides an estimation of the probability of each grid cell to be occupied by a person. Given two to four synchronized video streams taken at eye level and from different angles, this method can effectively combine a generative model with dynamic programming to accurately follow up to six individuals across thousands of frames in spite of significant occlusions and lighting changes. It can also derive metrically accurate trajectories for each one of them. While standard multi-camera systems often struggle with low-light 'edge cases,' newer frameworks incorporate multi-modal sensor fusion to detect non-upright pedestrians. For instance, combining Long-Wave Infrared (LWIR), Near-Infrared (NIR) stereo vision, and ultrasonic sensors allows for the detection of falling or collapsed humans with high accuracy (up to 98.2%), providing a critical safety layer for autonomous vehicles in zero-visibility conditions.

== Related seminal work ==
- Histogram of oriented gradients
- Integral channel feature

== See also ==
- Human presence detection
- Human sensing
