= Skaleet =

French banking software company

- Founded: 2005; 21 years ago
- Country of origin: France
- Website: tagpay.fr/en/ and; skaleet.com/en/

Skaleet (formerly named TagPay) is a digital banking platform or SaaS based core banking system created by the French company TagPay. The software is used by banks, telecom operators, and other players to offer digital financial services to their clients.

Skaleet uses sound-based Near Sound Data Transfer (NSDT) technology to secure electronic transactions. Skaleet's target markets are in emerging economies.

== History ==
The platform was created by the French company TagPay in 2005.

The company received €25million in funding from Long Arc Capital at the beginning of 2021 to develop its product. In 2023, the company joined the Banking Industry Architecture Network (BIAN) which helps to promote a common framework for banking technology.

== Applications ==
Skaleet can be used by smart phones and supports a variety of mobile money services.

As of 2021, over 30 digital financial service providers use the Skaleet platform to offer their customers financial services through their mobile phones.
