= Cross-device tracking =

Tracking of users between different devices

Cross-device tracking is technology that enables the tracking of users across multiple devices such as smartphones, television sets, smart TVs, and personal computers.

Cross-device tracking is a technique in which technology companies and advertisers deploy trackers, often in the form of unique identifiers, cookies, or ultrasonic signals, to generate a profile of users across multiple devices. Cross-device tracking can use audio beacons, or inaudible sounds, emitted by one device and recognized through the microphone of the other device.

This form of tracking is used primarily by technology companies and advertisers who use this information to piece together a cohesive profile of the user. These profiles inform and predict the type of advertisements the user receives.

== Background ==
Online tracking can be performed in many ways. One historical method used website sign-ins to associate activity with an account. This is a form of deterministic cross-device tracking, in which the user's devices are associated with their account credentials, such as their email or username. While the user is logged in, the company can access a history of websites visited and ads the user interacted with across computers and mobile devices.

Cookies were later deployed by advertisers, providing each user with a unique identifier in the user's browser so that the user's preferences could be monitored. This unique identifier informs the placement of relevant, targeted ads the user may receive. Cookies were also used by companies to improve the user experience, enabling users to resume activity on websites. However, as users began using multiple devices—up to around five—advertisers had difficulty tracking, managing, and consolidating this data across multiple devices as the cookie-based model suggested that each device—whether a phone, computer, or tablet—was a different person.

Other technologies such as supercookies, which stay on computers long after the user deletes their cookies, and web beacons, which are unique images from a URL, are also used by trackers and advertisers to gain increased insight into users' behavior. However, advertisers were still limited in that only one device was able to be tracked and associated with a user.

Cross-device tracking initially emerged to associate a user's activity across multiple devices with a single profile.

Browser fingerprinting can be used to identify users based on distinctive browser and device characteristics. It has raised privacy concerns because of its effectiveness and because users may have limited ability to opt out of this type of tracking.

Google's AdID can be used on smartphones in combination with cookies on a user's computer to track behavior across devices.

One cross-device tracking method uses audio beacons, or inaudible sounds, emitted by one device and recognized through the microphone of another device, usually a smartphone. Cross-device tracking has also been discussed in relation to the Internet of things (IoT), in which devices such as office equipment, cars, and home appliances are connected through the internet.

== Applications ==
Studies have shown that 234 Android applications are eavesdropping on these ultrasonic channels without the user's awareness.

Applications such as SilverPush, Shopkick, and Lisnr are part of an "ultrasonic side-channel" in which the app, often unbeknownst to the user, intercepts ultrasonic signals emitted from the user's environment, such as from a TV, to track which advertisements the user has heard and how long the person listened to them.

- SilverPush—the leading company using this technology—patented software enabling them to track TV ads based on audio stream above
- Shopkick, another popular application, gives discounts to users who shop at stores which emit these ultrasonic beacons, allowing them to create a profile of the user
- Lisnr uses a user's location data in tandem with ultrasonic beacons to give users coupons related to their activities

Another study suggested that Apple, Google, and Bluetooth Special Interest groups need to do more to prevent cross-device tracking.

== Privacy and surveillance concerns ==
=== Ultrasonic tracking ===
Humans interpret sound by picking up on different frequencies. Given the variety of sound waves that exist, humans can only hear frequencies that are within a certain range––generally from 20 Hz to 20 kHz. By the age of 30, most humans cannot hear sounds above 18 kHz.

Ultrasound, which is shorter wavelengths greater than or equal to 20 kHz, enables the rapid transmission of data necessary for cross-device tracking to occur.

Another integral component of cross-device tracking is the usage of audio beacons. Audio beacons are beacons that are embedded into ultrasound, so they cannot be heard by humans. These audio beacons are used to surreptitiously track a user's location and monitor online behavior by connecting with the microphone on another device without the user's awareness.

In October 2015, the Center for Democracy and Technology submitted comments to the Federal Trade Commission (FTC) regarding cross-device tracking technology, specifically mentioning SilverPush.

Audio "beacons" can be embedded into television advertisements. In a similar manner to radio beacons, these can be picked up by mobile apps. This allows the behavior of users to be tracked, including which ads were seen by the user and how long they watched an ad before changing the channel.

In March 2016, the FTC issued warning letters to 12 app developers using cross-device tracking in their apps. The FTC warned these developers that they may be violating the FTC Act if they state or imply that their apps are not tracking television viewing habits when they in fact are.

Cross-device tracking has privacy implications and allows for more detailed tracking of users than traditional tracking methods. Data can be collected from multiple devices used by a single user and correlated to form a more accurate picture of the person being tracked. Moreover, malicious actors may use variants of the technology to de-anonymize anonymity network users.

Ultrasonic tracking technologies can pose massive threats to a user's privacy. There are four primary privacy concerns associated with this new form of tracking:

- The first is media tracking: audio from the user's television may be detected by the microphone in the user's mobile device, allowing malicious actors to gain access to what the user is watching––particularly if it is salacious. Advertisers can similarly gain insight into what a user typically watches. In both scenarios, a user's real-world behavior is linked to their online identity and used for tracking.
- Another form of tracking permitted by ultrasonic tracking is cross-device tracking, which enables a user's profile to be connected across multiple devices based on proximity. This form of tracking, in linking different devices, can help advertisers show more targeted ads or open individuals to attacks by malicious actors.
- Location tracking is yet another privacy concern. Indeed, ultrasonic signals can convey location information via a location identifier, often placed in stores or businesses.
- Lastly, this new ultrasonic tracking poses a threat to users of Bitcoin and Tor because it de-anonymizes a user's information, since ultrasonic signals associate the user's mobile phone with the Bitcoin or Tor account.

=== Panoptic surveillance and the commodification of users' digital identity ===
From cookies to ultrasonic trackers, some argue that invasive forms of surveillance underscore how users are trapped in a digital panopticon, similar to the concept envisioned by Jeremy Bentham: a prison in which the prisoners were able to be seen at all times by guards but were unable to detect when, or even if, they were being watched at all, creating a sense of paranoia that drove prisoners to carefully police their own behavior. Similarly, scholars have drawn parallels between Bentham's panopticon and today's pervasive use of internet tracking in that individuals lack awareness to the vast disparities of power that exist between themselves and the corporation to which they willingly give their data. In essence, companies are able to gain access to consumers' activity when they use a company's services. The usage of these services often is beneficial, which is why users agree to exchange personal information. However, since users participate in this unequal environment, in which corporations hold most of the power and in which the user is obliged to accept the bad faith offers made by the corporations, users are operating in an environment that ultimately controls, shapes and molds them to think and behave in a certain way, depriving them of privacy.

In direct response to the panoptic and invasive forms of tracking manifesting themselves within the digital realm, some have turned to sousveillance: a form of inverse surveillance in which users can record those who are surveilling them, thereby empowering themselves. This form of counter surveillance, often used through small wearable recording devices, enables the subversion of corporate and government panoptic surveillance by holding those in power accountable and giving people a voice––a permanent video record––to push back against government abuses of power or malicious behavior that may go unchecked.

The television, along with the remote control, is also argued to be conditioning humans into habitually repeating that which they enjoy without experiencing genuine surprise or even discomfort, a critique of the television similar to that of those made against information silos on social media sites today. In essence, this technological development led to egocasting: a world in which people exert extreme amounts of control over what they watch and hear. As a result, users deliberately avoid content they disagree with in any form––ideas, sounds, or images. In turn, this siloing can drive political polarization and stoke tribalism. Plus, companies like TiVO analyze how TV show watchers use their remote and DVR capability to skip over programming, such as advertisements––a privacy concern users may lack awareness of as well.

Some scholars have even contended that in an age of increased surveillance, users now participate online through the active generation and curation of online images––a form of control. In so doing, users can be seen as rejecting the shame associated with their private lives. Other scholars note that surveillance is fundamentally dependent upon location in both physical and virtual environments. This form of surveillance can be seen in travel websites which enable the user to share their vacation to a virtual audience. The person's willingness to share their personal information online is validated by the audience, since the audience holds the user accountable and the user vicariously experiences pleasure through the audience. Further, users' mobile data is increasingly being shared to third parties online, potentially underscoring the regulatory challenges inherent in protecting users' online privacy.

In addition, scholars argue that users have the right to know the value of their personal data. Increasingly, users' digital identity is becoming commodified through the selling and monetizing of their personal data for profit by large companies. Unfortunately, many people appear to be unaware of the fact that their data holds monetary value that can potentially be used towards other products and services. Thus, scholars are arguing for users' to have increased awareness and transparency into this process so that users can become empowered and informed consumers of data.

=== Surveillance capitalism ===
The increased usage of cross-device tracking by advertisers is indicative of the rise of a new era of data extraction and analysis as a form of profit, or surveillance capitalism, a term coined by Shoshana Zuboff. This form of capitalism seeks to commodify private human experience to create behavioral futures markets, in which behavior is predicted and behavioral data is harvested from the user. Zuboff suggests that this new era of surveillance capitalism eclipses Bentham's panopticon, becoming far more encroaching and invasive as, unlike a prison, there is no escape, and the thoughts, feelings, and actions of users are immediately extracted to be commodified and resold. Thus, since cross-device tracking seeks to create a profile of a user across multiple devices, big tech companies, such as Google, could use this behavioral data to make predictions about the user's future behavior without the user's awareness.

Scholars are beginning to discuss the possibility of quantifying the monetary value of users' personal data. Notably, the algorithms used to extract and mine user data are increasingly seen as business assets and thus protected via trade secrets. Indeed, the usage of free online services, such as public Wi-Fi, often comes at the unknown cost to the user of being tracked and profiled by the company providing the service. In essence, a transaction is occurring: users' personal data is being exchanged for access to a free service. Increasingly, scholars are advocating for users' right to understand the fundamental value of their personal data more intimately so as to be more savvy, informed consumers who have the ability to protect the privacy of their online information and not be manipulated into unwittingly giving away personal information.

=== Health and wellness applications ===
In addition, health and wellness applications also have a dearth of privacy protections as well: a study found that many health apps lacked encryption and that regulators should enforce stronger data privacy protections. The study stated that of the 79 apps they tested, none of the applications locally encrypted the users' personal information and 89% of the applications pushed the data online. The lack of adequate privacy and security measures surrounding users' personal medical data on mobile applications underscores the lessening degree to which users can trust mobile app developers to safeguard their personal information online. While mobile application developers continue to confront privacy and security concerns, users are increasingly looking to ways to visualize their data through wearable devices and applications that track their workout and exercise routines. Indeed, researchers discovered that these self-tracking devices play a role as a tool, a toy, and a tutor in users' lives. In the tool role, the self-tracking device functions as a mechanism to help the user in some capacity, often to achieve personal health goals. The toy role underscores how some self-tracking users see it as a fun game, particularly with regard to rewards and viewing the visualized data. Lastly, the tutor role reflects how users gain insights from and motivation about their activity from the apps themselves. Other scholars have characterized self-tracking as performing for the system, or controlling what is (or isn't) recorded, performing for the self, tracking themselves to gain insight into their behavior, and performing for other people, or the importance of how other people viewed the person being tracked, as well as the control the person being tracked had over their data and thus how they are perceived.

=== Cookies, flash cookies, and web beacons ===
Additionally, privacy concerns surround cookies, flash cookies, and web beacons on websites today. Ultimately, five main concerns surround the usage of cookies, flash cookies, and web beacons, according to a study:

- Firstly, the authors note that users lack anonymity online, with cookies using unique identifiers and flash cookies enabling recognition of website visits
- Another concern the authors note is unintended uses of cookies, since cookies were initially designed to benefit the user's experience and engagement online, but have since morphed into a business run by advertisers in which personal data is sold for profit
- Users are likely unaware of how their personal information is being used, reflecting the surreptitious nature of data collection
- Some cookies trespass into the web users' own resources and are downloaded to the user's computer often without the user's awareness
- Lastly, the authors note that the threat of cookie sharing underscores how web users' personal information can become combined with other data from websites and even a social security number to create a more cohesive picture of the user

=== Data capitalism ===
Other scholars have defined a similarly extractive and destructive phenomenon called data capitalism. Data capitalism is an economic system enabling the redistribution of power towards those who have access to the information––namely, big corporations. There are three fundamental theories of how large companies engage users in virtual communities, reflecting the power of data capitalism on users today:

- The free and open network: in making products free, large companies make their products more accessible to a larger audience from which they can extract valuable data in exchange.
- The connection between people and machines: data capitalism promotes a connection between people and machines which is derived from the user's relationship to the technology itself. Increasingly, tracking and surveillance technology is profiling users and learning their preferences, users become more comfortable with their devices and a self-fulfilling prophecy continues.
- The value placed on data: new information asymmetries are proliferating that exacerbate inequality of information and allow only the most powerful access to most people's data. Increasingly, a scholar suggests that the lack of transparency over users' data reflects the tension between privacy and community online.

=== Solutions ===
Scholars are convinced the current notice-and-consent model for privacy policies is fundamentally flawed because it assumes users intuitively understand all of the facts in a privacy policy, which is often not the case. Instead, scholars emphasize the imperative role of creating a culture in which privacy becomes a social norm. In effect, users of online technologies should identify the social activities they use on the internet and start questioning websites' governing norms as a natural outgrowth of their web browsing. In effect, these norms need to prevent websites from collecting and sharing users' personal information. In addition, starting with a user's personal values and seeing how these values correlate with online norms may be another way to assess whether or not privacy norms are being violated in odd cases. Ultimately, scholars believe these privacy norms are vital to protecting both individuals and social institutions.

== Legal and ethical issues ==
While the United States lacks extensive privacy rights, the Fourth Amendment provides some privacy protections. The Fourth Amendment states that "the right of the people to be secure in their persons, houses, papers, and effects, against unreasonable searches and seizures, shall not be violated", suggesting that while individuals are protected from all levels of the government, they are not legally protected from private companies or individuals with malicious intent.

There are large implications for this technology within the legal field. Legally, The Federal Trade Commission has a responsibility to prevent deceptive practices by technology companies, such as those that could lead to consumer injury. The FTC has made efforts to prevent invasive web tracking, tracking in physical space, malware, insecure and poorly designed services, and the use of deception to engage in surveillance. For instance, in the realm of invasive web tracking, the FTC has brought lawsuits against companies who engage in history sniffing, a technique that enables companies to ascertain which links a user clicked on based on the color of the link. Concerning tracking in physical space, the FTC has also cracked down on Nomi, a company that scans the MAC addresses of customers' phones in stores. MAC addresses function as a unique identifier, enabling the connection to wireless networks. In the case of malware, the FTC has placed pressure on companies such as CyberSpy, a self-proclaimed email attachment company that claimed to secretly record users' key presses. The FTC has also cracked down on companies like Compete, a browser toolbar, because it decrypted users' personal information on the internet, putting users at risk. Lastly, in cases during which deception is used to engage in surveillance, the FTC has investigated private investigators, who surveil individuals on another person's behalf. In addition, audio beacon technology, used by an application called Silverpush, could violate the FTC's policies because users were not made aware as to when the ultrasonic signals were being recorded.

Another scholar believes that the convergence between lived experience and online technology is creating a term called mixed reality, in which people and things are replaced with virtual experiences. Mixed Reality technologies can pose legal challenges in that laws which govern the online world will also extend to the real world. In addition, data tagging––often through GPS, location-based services, or even near-field communication (NFC)––is the new technology at the heart of mixed reality, since people's data is determined in part by their location. Near-field communication enables devices to transmit data to each other with a certain range. Virtual reality can become a privacy issue because it attempts to immerse users into the virtual environment by recording a user's every sensation. In turn, mixed reality's amalgamation with daily tasks suggest that it will be implicated in numerous legal issues ranging from copyright law to intellectual property law. Customers are also being denied a voice in contracts, since only corporations set the rules by which individuals' private information is mined and extracted. The solution to these issues, according to scholars, are opt-in controls to police users' privacy that enable balance to be restored to the law, particularly as it stands regarding contracts.

Ethically, Zuboff points to the extraction, commodification, and analysis of private human experiences as well as increased surveillance—which is sometimes hidden—in everyday life as violating users' rights to privacy. The usage of surreptitious methods, in which the user is unaware of the extent to which they are being tracked, brings tracking mechanisms—such as cookies, flash cookies, and web beacons—into the ethical realm as well since users are not being informed of this tracking perhaps as often as they should.

== See also ==
- Behavioral analytics
- Behavioral targeting
- Internet privacy
- Privacy concerns with social networking services
- Surveillance
- Website visitor tracking
