= MmWave sensing =

System of radar sensors

mmWave sensing is a remote sensing technique using millimeter wave (mmWave) radar to measure displacement as small as a fraction of a millimeter. This system requires a mmWave radar sensor to transmit and receive pulses of millimeter electromagnetic wave energy, detecting targets and motion from the reflections it receives back.

Additional components such as converters, signal processors and other embedded technologies create new use cases and improve performance of the system. Current applications for this technology include human and animal movement tracking, human presence detection, and detection of vital signs for use across automotive, meteorological, medical and pet health industries and is often an alternative to wearable-based technologies for the same uses.

== Background ==
Compared to sensing technologies using other radio frequencies in the electromagnetic spectrum such as infrared or ultra-wideband, mmWave uses 30 to 300 gigahertz (GHz). Typical mmWave sensors use the 24-, 60- and 77-GHz band each with their own benefits for specific applications.

== Applications ==
=== Automotive ===
mmWave sensing can be used inside vehicles to improve driver and passenger safety and comfort functions. Notable advantages of using mmWave technology in vehicles revolve around its capability to operate effectively in spaces with low-lighting and limited visibility. mmWave sensing can penetrate materials like plastic, textiles, and glass, making it contactless.

Recent applications for automotive mmWave sensing include:

- Occupancy detection
- Child presence detection (CPD)
- Seatbelt reminders
- Optimized airbag deployment
- Monitoring of driver vital signs

=== Assisted Living and Elderly Care ===
mmWave sensing can be used in homes and nursing homes to assist seniors, individuals aging in place, and caregivers. Using mmWave technology is non-intrusive as it does not use cameras or microphones for its applications, and does not require patients to use wearable devices for tracking.

Use-cases in assisted living and elderly care include:

- Fall detection
- Posture detection
- Occupancy detection
- Vital signs monitoring

=== Smart Home ===
Integrated within applications for presence and occupancy detection, mmWave sensing can be applied to the smart home to enable home automations without requiring wearable technology or cameras. Applications include:

- Water level detection of toilets
- Sleep apnea tracking
- Smart lighting control

=== Other ===
Other applications for mmWave sensing include pet monitoring, where the technology can be used to track and monitor animal vital signs to interpret pet emotions.
