= Operations Support Branch =

Cyber-intelligence unit of the CIA

Agency overview
- Type: Department of the Central Intelligence Agency
- Status: Active (As of 2020)
- Headquarters: Virginia
- Parent agency: Central Intelligence Agency

The Operations Support Branch (OSB) is a unit of the cyber-intelligence division of the Central Intelligence Agency (CIA). It is located on the ninth floor of a secret facility in the suburbs of northern Virginia, west of Washington, D.C. Patrick Radden Keefe described the OSB as the CIA's "secret hacker unit, in which a cadre of élite engineers create cyberweapons" in a June 2022 article for The New Yorker.

The OSB specializes in physical access operations in which 'physical access' is gained to electronic devices owned by high value individual targets such as foreign government officials and terrorists. The OSB is able to quickly develop tools that can be utilised in cyberintelligence missions at short notice.

According to anonymous witnesses who testified at Joshua Schulte's trial, the OSB was filled with workspace pranks, like stealing coworkers' things, name calling, shoving matches, rubber band and Nerf gun wars. Asked if she was aware of this, the former head of CIA's Center for Cyber Intelligence Bonnie Stith said she was not.

The employees of the OSB numbered about a dozen in the 2010s. Radden Keefe described the extreme secrecy of the OSB at this period as resulting in staff unable to " ... take work home, or talk with anyone on the outside about what they did all day. Their office was a classified sanctum, a locked vault. Like the crew of a submarine, they forged strong bonds—and strong antagonisms". The software engineer Joshua Schulte was employed by the OSB from 2010 to 2016. He was convicted of being the leaker of the Vault 7 documents which detail electronic surveillance and cyber warfare tools developed by the CIA. Schulte was nicknamed 'Voldemort' during his time at the OSB. The leak and publication of the Vault 7 documents was a significant blow to the CIA, a senior official likened it to the 'digital' equivalent of the attack on Pearl Harbor in its scope and fallout.
