= SlickLogin =

Israeli start-up company

- Type: Private
- Industry: Information Technology
- Website: www.slicklogin.com

SlickLogin was an Israeli start-up company that developed sound-based password alternatives. The company's goal was to enable end users to log in easily to password-protected websites by using a uniquely generated sound.

The company was founded by Or Zelig, who served as the firm's CEO, Eran Galili, CTO, and Ori Kabeli, VP of R&D. All three were graduates of elite IDF cyber-security units and had worked together for six years.

In February 2014, Google announced the acquisition of the company.

SlickLogin used various protocols to start verifying your phone's position: WiFi, Bluetooth, NFC, visual markers like QR codes, and GPS. Their self-dubbed "secret sauce" was the use of uniquely generated sounds intentionally made inaudible to the human ear. The user's computer played sound through speakers, while a mobile app used the device's built-in microphone to pick up the audio, analyze it, and send the signal to the site's server for authentication.

== See also ==
- SilverPush
- Near sound data transfer
