= Air-gap malware =

Type of malicious software

Air-gap malware is malware that is designed to defeat the air-gap isolation of secure computer systems using various air-gap covert channels.

== Operation ==
Because most modern computers, especially laptops, have built-in microphones and speakers, air-gap malware can be designed to communicate secure information acoustically, at frequencies near or beyond the limit of human hearing. The technique is limited to computers in close physical proximity (about 65 feet (20 m)), and is also limited by the requirement that both the transmitting and receiving machines be infected with the proper malware to form the communication link. The physical proximity limit can be overcome by creating an acoustically linked mesh network, but is only effective if the mesh network ultimately has a traditional Ethernet connection to the outside world by which the secure information can be removed from the secure facility. In 2014, researchers introduced ″AirHopper″, a bifurcated attack pattern showing the feasibility of data exfiltration from an isolated computer to a nearby mobile phone, using FM frequency signals.

In 2015, "HELLONE", a covert signaling channel between air-gapped computers using thermal manipulations, was introduced. "BitWhisper" supports bidirectional communication and requires no additional dedicated peripheral hardware.

Later in 2015, researchers introduced "GSMem", a method for exfiltrating data from air-gapped computers over cellular frequencies. The transmission - generated by a standard internal bus - renders the computer into a small cellular transmitter antenna.

In 2016, researchers categorized various "out-of-band covert channels" (OOB-CCs), which are malware communication channels that require no specialized hardware at the transmitter or receiver. OOB-CCs are not as high-bandwidth as conventional radio-frequency channels; however, they are capable of leaking sensitive information that require low data rates to communicate (e.g., text, recorded audio, cryptographic key material).

In 2020, researchers of ESET Research reported Ramsay Malware, a cyber espionage framework and toolkit that collects and steals sensitive documents like Word documents from systems on air-gapped networks.

== Examples ==
Stuxnet is a malicious Air-gap malware first uncovered on 17 June 2010 and thought to have been in development since at least 2005. Stuxnet targets supervisory control and data acquisition (SCADA) systems and is believed to be responsible for causing substantial damage to the Iran nuclear program after it was first installed on a computer at the Natanz Nuclear Facility in 2009.

== See also ==
- Air gap (networking)
- BadBIOS
