= Human sensing =

Technologies to detect a human presence

Human sensing (also called human detection or human presence detection) encompasses a range of technologies for detecting the presence of a human body in an area of space, typically without the intentional participation of the detected person. Common applications include search and rescue, surveillance, and customer analytics (for example, people counters).

Modern technologies proposed or deployed for human sensing include:

- Acoustic sensors
- Image recognition of human shapes
- Infrared detectors
- Pressure-sensitive floor tiles
- Radar
- Chemical sensors
- Detection of the mobile phone, computer, Bluetooth, or Wi-Fi signals of a device assumed to be in the possession of a person.
- WiFi Sensing

== Examples ==
In 1997 CAPTCHA ("Completely Automated Public Turing test to tell Computers and Humans Apart") was invented. A test is presented to detect that a computer is being used by a human operator, preventing access to a protected resource by programs such as spam robots.

Various commercial heartbeat detection systems employ a set of vibration or seismic sensors to detect the presence of a person inside a vehicle or container by sensing vibrations caused by the human heartbeat.

Another commercial product uses infrared light to detect the level of carbon dioxide in an enclosed space, from which it infers the presence of humans or other living creatures.

In September 2013, the United States Department of Homeland Security's Science and Technology Directorate demonstrated a prototype of the FINDER radar technology device, which it developed in conjunction with NASA's Jet Propulsion Laboratory. FINDER uses microwave radar to detect the unique signature of a human's breathing pattern and heartbeat, through 20 feet of solid concrete, 30 feet of a crushed mixture of concrete and rebar, and 100 feet of open space.

In September 2014, the DHS promoted the technology to SWAT teams at the Urban Shield trade show.

In 2019, waste management company Total Waste Solutions developed a device to help protect homeless people who seek shelter inside industrial bins from harm.

== See also ==
- Presence detection devices like a Light curtain
