= Human presence detection =

Technology for the detection of human bodies

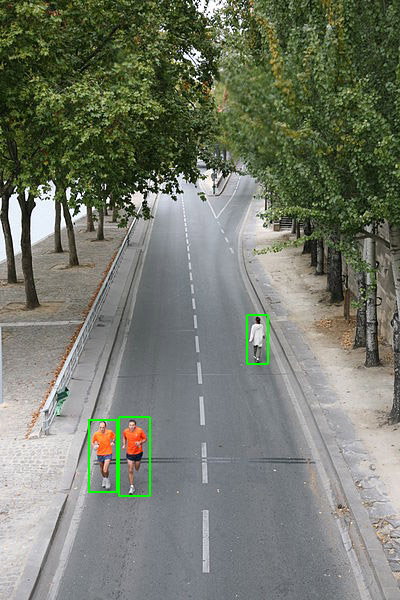
Example of a video pedestrian detection system

Human presence detection is a range of technologies and methods for detecting the presence of a human body in an area of interest (AOI), or verification that computer, smartphone (or other device controlled by software) is operated by human. Software and hardware technologies are used for human presence detection. Unlike human sensing, that is dealing with human body only, human presence detection technologies are used to verify for safety, security or other reasons that human person, but not any other object is identified. Methods can be used for internet security authentication. These include software technologies such CAPTCHA and reCAPTCHA, as well as hardware technologies such as:

- Radar technology
- Image recognition of human shapes
- Security switch
- Fingerprint sensors
- Infrared detectors
- Acoustic sensors
- Vibration sensors

== Examples ==
- reCAPTCHA is a CAPTCHA-like system designed to establish that a computer user is human (normally in order to protect websites from bots) and, at the same time, assist in the digitization of books.
- A sensor based on a piezoelectric film (EMFI sensor) is used to detect mechanical vibrations and the presence of a person seated on the rear bench of a vehicle. In order to distinguish between humans, heavy objects, and empty seats, signal processing techniques are used. mmWave radar technology can also be used to detect the presence and location of humans in vehicles.

== History ==
The first robot to successfully demonstrate a static motion detection capability was ROBART I, which was Everett's 1981 thesis project at the Naval Postgraduate School. In 1997 CAPTCHA ("Completely Automated Public Turing test to tell Computers and Humans Apart") was invented. This test is used to ensure that computer is operated by a human, preventing spam robots.

== See also ==
- Face detection – Identification of human faces in images
- Human sensing – Technologies to detect a human presence
- CAPTCHA – Test to determine whether a user is human
- Security switch – Physical software-controlling switch
