= Near sound data transfer =

Sound-based mobile transaction technology

Near Sound Data Transfer (NSDT) is a sound-based mobile transaction technology developed and patented by Tagattitude since 2005. NSDT uses a one time password sent through the audio channel of a mobile device to create an electronic signature enabling secure transactions. The technology uses a phone's audio input and output (speaker and microphone) functionality and thus is compatible with mobile phones in use worldwide.

== Applications ==
NSDT is primarily used for mobile banking transactions through the mobile money platform Tagpay. It is also used to securely open doors and enable authentication on websites.

== See also ==
- Air gap (networking)
- BadBIOS
- SlickLogin
- Van Eck phreaking
