= BadBIOS =

BIOS-based computer malware

BadBIOS is alleged malware described by network security researcher Dragoș Ruiu in October 31, 2013 with the ability to communicate between instances of itself across air gaps using ultrasonic communication between a computer's speakers and microphone. To date, there have been no proven occurrences of this malware.

Ruiu says that the malware is able to infect the BIOS of computers running Windows, Mac OS X, BSD and Linux as well as spread infection over USB flash drives. Rob Graham of Errata Security produced a detailed analysis of each element of the descriptions of BadBIOS's capabilities, describing the software as "plausible", whereas Paul Ducklin on the Sophos Naked Security blog suggested "It's possible, of course, that this is an elaborate hoax". After Ruiu posted data dumps which supposedly demonstrated the existence of the virus, "all signs of maliciousness were found to be normal and expected data".

== See also ==
- Air gap (networking)
- Near sound data transfer
- Van Eck phreaking
