= John M. Hollerbach =

American computer scientist

- Born: Marktheidenfeld, Germany
- Education: University of Michigan; Massachusetts Institute of Technology
- Known for: Year of the Robot initiative Utah/MIT dextrous hand
- Awards: CIFAR Fellow (1988); IEEE Fellow (1996); IEEE Robotics and Automation Society Distinguished Service Award (2012)
- Scientific career
- Fields: Robotics; Haptic technology Medical robotics Telepresence
- Workplaces: IBM; Massachusetts Institute of Technology; McGill University; University of Utah
- Thesis: A Study of Human Motor Control Through Analysis and Synthesis of Handwriting (1978)
- Doctoral advisor: David Marr
- Website: http://www.cs.utah.edu/~jmh/

John Matthew Hollerbach is a professor of computer science and research professor of mechanical engineering at the University of Utah. He is the editor of The International Journal of Robotics Research, a Senior Editor of Presence: Teleoperators & Virtual Environments, and a Governing Board member of the electronic journal Haptics-e.

== Early life and education ==
Hollerbach was born in Marktheidenfeld, Germany to Hungarian refugees who met and married in a displacement camp. He and his family lived in a priest's attic in Germany for five years before emigrating to Detroit as refugees.

He received his BS in chemistry in 1968 from the University of Michigan but was interested in the growing computer industry and spent an extra year taking computer science courses to receive an MS in mathematics. Following graduation, he worked at IBM as a chemist but took courses in artificial intelligence and computer science as part of an education program with Syracuse University. He then applied to the Massachusetts Institute of Technology, where he worked with Patrick Winston in the Artificial Intelligence Laboratory on modeling solid objects and received his SM in computer vision in 1975. He continued at MIT in the Department of Brain and Cognitive Science PhD program to study the acquisition of fine motor skills for use in robotics. He obtained special permission to have David Marr as his thesis advisor because Marr was a research scientist and not yet a faculty member at the time. As a result, Hollerbach was technically Marr's first student, although Shimon Ullman was the first student to graduate under him. Hollerbach received his PhD from MIT in 1978.

== Career ==
Following his PhD, Hollerbach continued at MIT as a research scientist in the Department of Brain and Cognitive Sciences and the Artificial Intelligence Laboratory to work on theories of human movement and control and adapting these theories to robotics, and officially joined the faculty in 1982.

=== Year of the Robot ===
In 1981 Hollerbach co-founded the Year of the Robot program at the MIT Artificial Intelligence Laboratory funded by the System Development Corporation and the Office of Naval Research with the goal of jump-starting serious research in robotics. During the 1970s robotics research was not considered a separate respectable scientific endeavor and was heavily oriented toward industrial robotics with limited vision in potential capabilities. The program aimed to rectify this by accelerating robotics research at MIT over a five-year period by supporting writing of a sourcebook on robotic manipulation, starting an annual high-level international academic conference and research journal, outlining an educational program, and building a dexterous and controllable robotic hand. In 1982, Hollerbach co-produced a robot motion sourcebook with J. Michael Brady, Matthew T. Mason, Tomas Lozano-Perez, and Timothy Johnson. The book contained sections on dynamics, trajectory planning, compliance and force control, feedback control, and spatial planning; each section had a substantial introduction that served as a tutorial in addition to research papers by 19 top robotics researchers, including Marc Raibert, Robin Popplestone, and Pat Ambler. An updated version of the sourcebook was published in 1989 edited by J. Michael Brady. In 1983, Hollerbach helped start the International Journal of Robotics Research and the International Symposium of Robotics Research.

=== Utah/MIT Dexterous Hand ===
As part of the Year of Robotics program, Hollerbach collaborated with Stephen Jacobsen and John Wood at the University of Utah to design, construction, and control a multi-fingered hand. The project began in 1981 and was completed in 1987. The hand design consisted of a 16-joint four-finger manipulator that used 32 artificial tendons sensing via the Hall effect. 12 copies were made for use in a variety of contexts. At the NYU Courant Institute of Mathematical Sciences, Ken Perlin, James Demmel, and Paul K. Wright obtained a copy to build simulation software for the hand. Carnegie Mellon University, Columbia University, University of Rochester and other university research labs obtained copies to explore multi-agent control, teleoperation, and apprenticeship learning.

=== Medical robotics ===
In 1989 Hollerbach left MIT and accepted a NSERC/CIFAR Industrial Chair at McGill University. He hired Martin Buehler as a Junior Chair and formed a joint laboratory with Ian Hunter to work on fundamental actuator design. In 1994 Hunter moved to MIT to start a group in bioinstrumentation and Hollerbach joined the faculty at the University of Utah to develop medical robotics. At Utah, he developed the TreadPort Active Wind Tunnel, an immersive virtual environment that mimics the haptic properties of walking using sensory cues to aid in rehabilitation.

== Awards ==
- 1984 National Science Foundation Presidential Young Investigator Award
- 1988 Fellow of the Canadian Institute for Advanced Research
- 1996 Fellow of the Institute for Electrical and Electronics Engineers
- 2012 IEEE Robotics and Automation Society Distinguished Service Award

== Selected publications ==
- Hierarchical Shape Descriptions of Objects by Selection and Modification of Prototypes (Scientiæ Magister thesis), The Artificial Intelligence Laboratory, Massachusetts Institute of Technology, Cambridge MA, AI-TR-346 of 1976. [The thesis offers (first) a theory of block-world descriptions focused on protrusions and indentations, and (second) a theory of generalized cylinder descriptions specialized to Greek vases.]
- Brady, Michael; Hollerbach, John M.; Johnson, Timothy L.; Mason, Matthew T.; Tomas, Lozano-Perez, eds. (1983). Robot Motion: Planning and Control. Cambridge, MA: MIT Press. ISBN 978-0262021821.
