= Matthew T. Mason =

American roboticist

- Born: August 24, 1952 (age 74); Oklahoma City, Oklahoma, United States
- Education: Massachusetts Institute of Technology
- Scientific career
- Fields: Robotics
- Workplaces: Carnegie Mellon University
- Thesis: Manipulator Grasping and Pushing Operations (1982)
- Doctoral advisor: Tomás Lozano-Pérez; Berthold K.P. Horn

Matthew Thomas Mason (born August 24, 1952 in Oklahoma City, Oklahoma) is an American roboticist and the former Director of the Robotics Institute at Carnegie Mellon University. Mason is a researcher in the area of robotic manipulation, and is the author of a highly cited textbook in the field.

In 2004, Mason received widespread media attention for developing the first origami folding robot, demonstrating advances in difficult manipulation tasks.

== Biography ==
Mason received his B.S., M.S., and Ph.D. degrees from the Massachusetts Institute of Technology in 1976, 1978, and 1982, respectively. His M.S. thesis Compliance and Force Control for Computer Control led Manipulators was advised by Berthold K.P. Horn, and his Ph.D. thesis Manipulator Grasping and Pushing Operations was advised by Tomas Lozano-Perez and Berthold K.P. Horn.

He worked at the IBM Thomas J. Watson Research Center as a research visitor in 1978, and has been teaching at the School of Computer Science and the Robotics Institute at Carnegie Mellon University since 1982. At CMU, Mason served as the chair of the robotics doctoral program from 1995–2004, and is currently the director of the Robotics Institute.

Mason served as the North American Editor of the Butterworths Series in Computer Automation from 1988 to 1994, the technical editor of the IEEE Journal on Robotics and Automation from 1989 to 1992, and on the board of editors for the MIT Robotics Review from 1988 to 1992. He is currently a member of the editorial and advisory board for the International Journal of Robotics Research.

Mason was National Science Foundation Fellow from 1976 to 1980. In 1983 he received the System Development Foundation Prize. In 1992 he became Fellow of the American Association for Artificial Intelligence, and in 2000 he became Fellow of the Institute of Electrical and Electronics Engineers. Mason was the Chief Scientist at Berkshire Grey.

== Work ==
Mason's work is organized around five topics:

- Mechanics of manipulation: modeling the physics of manipulation and how these models translates into implementation in robots.
- Robotic origami: the problem of origami as a challenging manipulation task for robots.
- Manipulation without hands: manipulation with a set of resources instead of just a manipulation subsystem (an arm).
- Locomotion without legs: exploiting all available resources for locomotion, similar to manipulation without hands
- Shortest paths for mobile robots: finding time optimal paths for robot motion.

== Publications ==
Mason has published several books and articles, a selection:

- Matthew T. Mason, Mechanics of Robotic Manipulation, MIT Press: Cambridge, MA. 2001.
- Pankaj Agarwal, Lydia Kavraki, and Matthew T. Mason, editors. Robotics: the Algorithmic Perspective: 1998 Workshop on the Algorithmic Foundations of Robotics, A K Peters: Boston. 1998.
- Matthew T. Mason and J. Kenneth Salisbury, Robot Hands and the Mechanics of Manipulation, MIT Press: Cambridge, MA. 1985.
- J. Michael Brady, John M. Hollerbach, Timothy Johnson, Tomas Lozano-Perez, and Matthew T. Mason, Robot Motion: Planning and Control, MIT Press: Cambridge, MA. 1982.
