= James Heilman =

Canadian emergency physician and Wikipedian

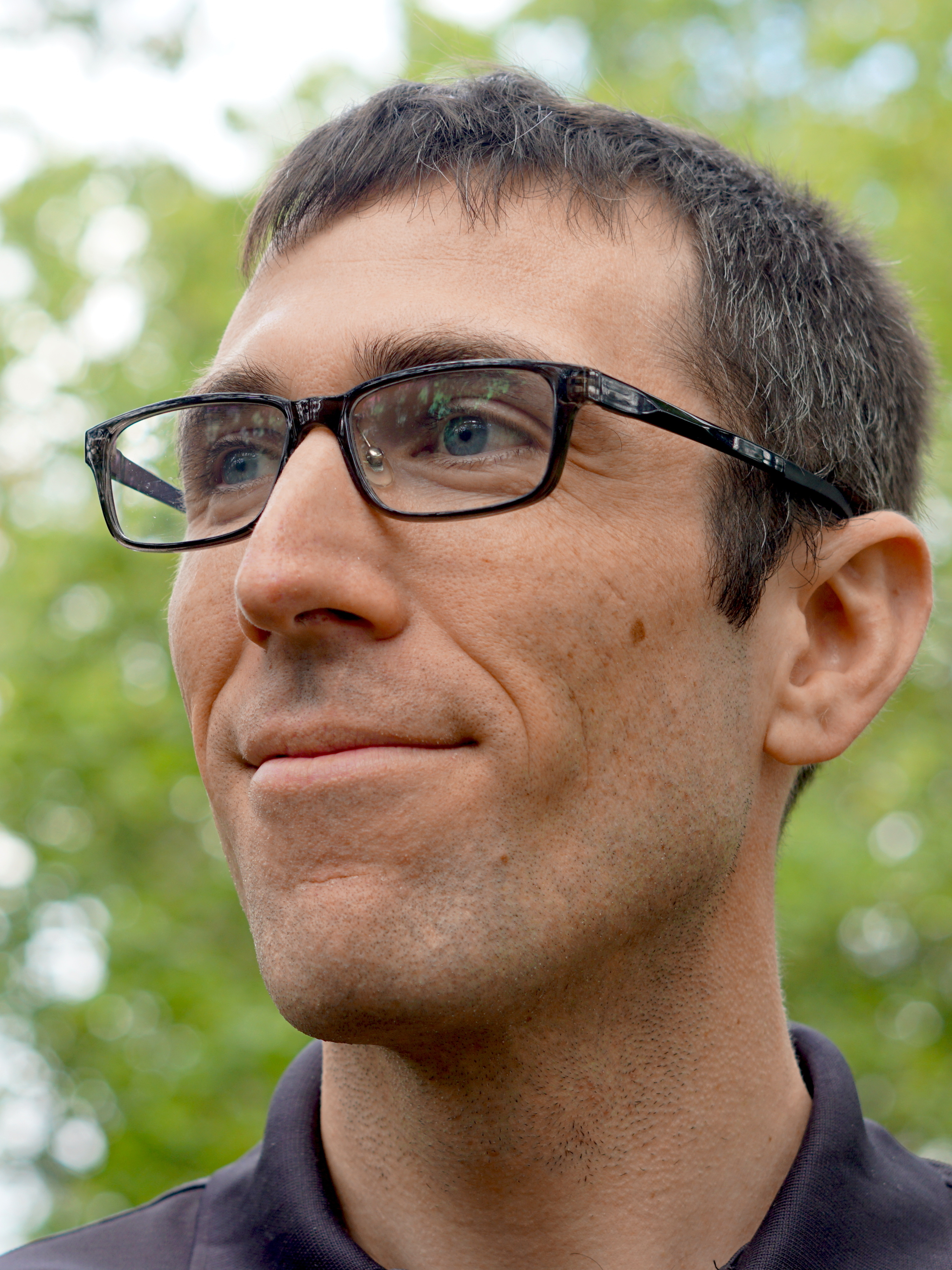
- Heilman in 2019
- Born: 1979 or 1980 (age 46–47); Saskatchewan, Canada
- Education: University of Saskatchewan (BS, MD)
- Medical career
- Profession: Physician
- Field: Emergency medicine
- Institutions: East Kootenay Regional Hospital; University of British Columbia
- James Heilman introducing himself recorded August 2017

James M. Heilman (born 1979 or 1980) is a Canadian emergency physician, Wikipedian, and advocate for the improvement of Wikipedia's health-related content. He encourages other clinicians to contribute to the online encyclopedia.

With the Wikipedia username Doc James, Heilman is an active contributor to WikiProject Medicine and a volunteer Wikipedia administrator. He was the president of Wikimedia Canada between 2010 and 2013, and founded and was formerly the president of Wiki Project Med Foundation. He is also the founder of WikiProject Medicine's Medicine Translation Task Force. In June 2015, he was elected to the Wikimedia Foundation Board of Trustees, a position which he held until he was removed on December 28, 2015. Heilman was re-elected to the Wikimedia Foundation Board of Trustees in May 2017. His term ended in November 2021.

Heilman is a clinical assistant professor at the department of emergency medicine at the University of British Columbia, and the head of the department of emergency medicine at East Kootenay Regional Hospital in Cranbrook, British Columbia, where he lives.

== Early life and education ==
Heilman was born in 1979 or 1980, near Cochin, Saskatchewan. He graduated from the University of Saskatchewan in 2000 with a Bachelor of Science degree in anatomy, and he subsequently earned his medical degree there in 2003. He then completed his family medicine residency in British Columbia from 2003 to 2005. Heilman currently holds a certificate of added competency in emergency medicine with the College of Family Physicians of Canada.

== Medical career ==
Heilman worked at Moose Jaw Union Hospital, a hospital in Moose Jaw, Saskatchewan, until 2010, when he began working at East Kootenay Regional Hospital, where, in October 2012, he was appointed head of the department of emergency medicine. In 2014, he told the Cranbrook Daily Townsman that the emergency department at East Kootenay saw an average of 22,000 patients each year.

== Research ==
As of May 2014, Heilman was working on a study with Samir Grover of the University of Toronto, which would assign medical students to take a test using either Wikipedia or medical textbooks to determine which is more accurate. Later that year, Heilman co-authored a version of the Wikipedia article for dengue fever in the peer-reviewed journal Open Medicine. Heilman also worked on a study with Microsoft which found that in the three countries where the 2013–2016 Ebola outbreak had the largest impact, Wikipedia was the most popular source for information about the disease. In 2015, Heilman and Andrew West published a study that found the number of Wikipedia editors focusing on editing medical articles decreased by 40 percent from 2008 to 2013. These results, together with other detailed analyses about the production and consumption of medical content on Wikipedia, were published by the Journal of Medical Internet Research in 2015.

== Wikipedia and Wikimedia activities ==
Question and answer session with Heilman about editing Wikipedia at the University of British Columbia

Since the beginning of his activity as a contributor to medicine-related Wikipedia articles in 2008, Heilman has been promoting the improvement of medical content by encouraging fellow physicians to take part. He became interested in editing Wikipedia on a slow night shift, when he looked up the article on obesity and found that it contained many errors. "I realized that I could fix it. I made a huge number of edits and improved the quality a great deal. I sort of became hooked from there," he told the Hamilton Spectator in 2011. In 2016, he stated that he edited medical articles on Wikipedia for about 60 hours a week. His time spent editing decreased to 20 hours a week in 2020, during the COVID-19 pandemic.

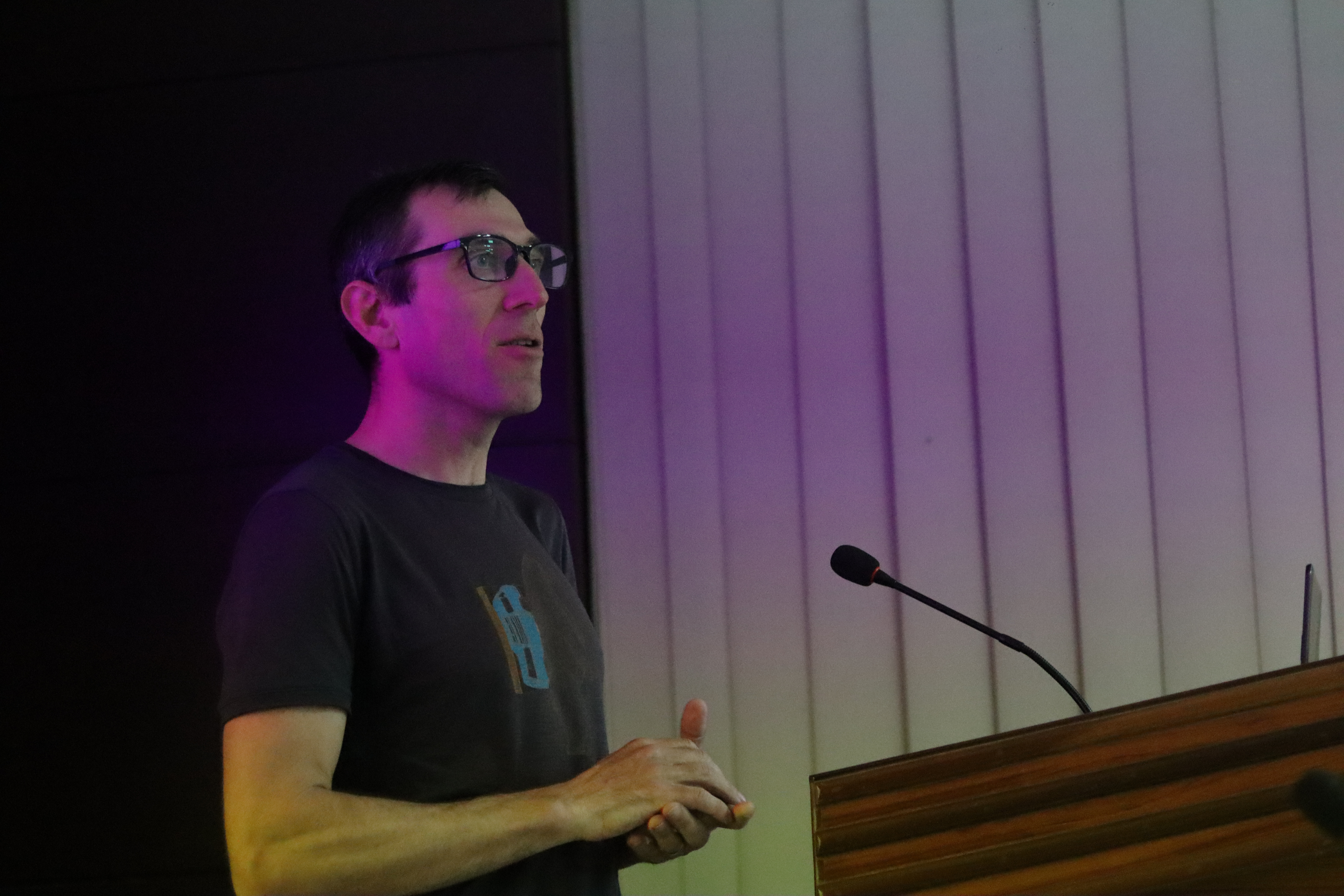
James Heilman presenting at Bangladesh University of Engineering and Technology during a session organized by BUET BMES Student Chapter in 2024

Heilman takes part in an initiative through Wiki Project Med Foundation with Translators Without Borders, working to improve and translate English Wikipedia medical articles of top importance into minority languages. The Wiki Project Med Foundation has started a collaboration with the University of California, San Francisco as a recruit for scientifically literate editors, by giving students college credit for improving medicine-related Wikipedia pages. In 2014, the Wiki Project Med Foundation also partnered with the Cochrane Collaboration, to improve the reliability and accuracy of information on Wikipedia. Concerning this partnership, Heilman said, "The way Wikipedia works is that all content is to stand entirely on the references that are listed. If the best quality sources are used to write Wikipedia there's a good chance that Wikipedia will contain the best quality information."

Heilman spoke at Wikimania 2014, where he said that 93 percent of medical students use Wikipedia, and argued that "fixing the internet" is now a critical task for anyone who cares about healthcare.

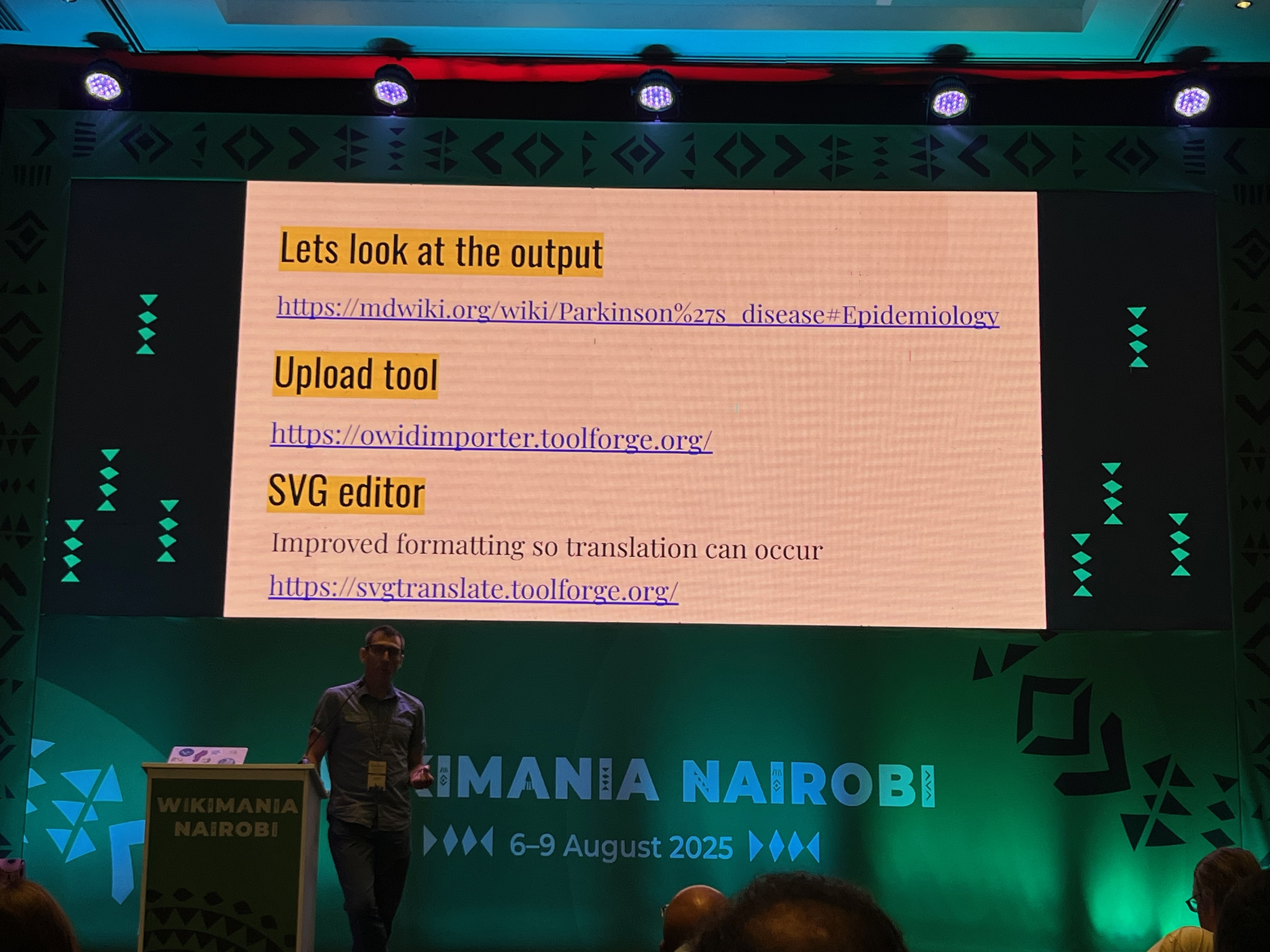
James Heilman gives a presentation at Wikimania 2025 during the session of Our World in Data (OWID) Visualizations to Wikipedia.

At the Wikimania 2025 conference in Nairobi, Kenya, Heilman gave a presentation on an interactive data visualization project using SVG image resources from Our World in Data to be embedded in related Wikipedia articles that will be available in multiple languages.

=== Ebola contributions ===
By reviewing and correcting medical content in the manner promoted by Heilman (and with many of his contributions), in Wikipedia articles like that about Ebola, Wikipedia has become a source of information to the general public, thus being regarded among respected sites run by the World Health Organization and the Centers for Disease Control and Prevention, covering the topic. Heilman reduced the time he spent working in the emergency department so he could spend more time updating this page. In 2014, he told the Cranbrook Daily Townsman that with respect to Wikipedia's coverage of Ebola, "The big thing is emphasizing what we know, making sure that minor concerns don’t get blown out of proportion." He also said that, despite rumours to the contrary, there was no evidence that the disease had become airborne, and that Ebola had caused far fewer deaths than other conditions such as malaria and gastroenteritis.

=== Rorschach test images ===
In 2009, Heilman, who was then a resident of Moose Jaw, Saskatchewan, added public domain images of the ink blots used in the Rorschach test to the Wikipedia article on the subject, and concerned psychologists said that this could invalidate the tests. Some psychologists stated the test had "already lost its popularity and usefulness." In an interview with The New York Times, Heilman stated that he added the entire set because a debate about a single image seemed absurd and psychologists' fears were unfounded. Appearing on Canada AM on July 31, 2009, Heilman also said that "This information [i.e. the inkblots] is encyclopedic. This is what people expect to see when they see this page." In August 2009, two Canadian psychologists filed complaints about Heilman to his local doctors' organization; Heilman called the complaints "intimidation tactics". In September 2009, the College of Psychologists of British Columbia urged the Saskatchewan College of Physicians and Surgeons to launch an investigation into Heilman's posting of the images. Heilman told CTV News that "The psychological community is trying to exclude everybody outside their field from taking part in discussions related to what they do. And personally, I think that's bad science." An extensive debate ensued on Wikipedia, and the images were kept.

=== Discovery of textbook plagiarism of Wikipedia ===
In 2012, Heilman noticed that the book Understanding and Management of Special Child in Pediatric Dentistry, published by Jaypee Brothers, contained a long passage about HIV that was plagiarized from Wikipedia's article on the subject. This subsequently led to the book being withdrawn by the publisher.

In October 2014, while reading a copy of the Oxford Textbook of Zoonoses (published by Oxford University Press), Heilman noticed that the book's section on Ebola was very similar to the Wikipedia page on that subject. He initially suspected that a Wikipedia editor had copied the portion, but later noticed that the part of the Wikipedia article that resembled the part of the textbook had been written in 2006 and 2010, while the textbook had not been published until 2011. Christian Purdy, an Oxford University Press spokesperson, acknowledged that some of the text in the textbook had been copied but described it as an "inadvertent omission of an appropriate attribution" rather than plagiarism.

=== Tenure on the Wikimedia Foundation Board of Trustees ===
In June 2015, Heilman was elected by the community to the Wikimedia Foundation Board of Trustees. In December 2015, the board removed Heilman from his position as a Trustee, a decision that generated substantial controversy amongst members of the Wikipedia community. A statement released by the board declared the lack of confidence of his fellow trustees in him as the reasons for his ousting. Heilman later stated that he "was given the option of resigning [by the board] over the last few weeks. As a community elected member, I see my mandate as coming from the community which elected me and thus declined to do so. I saw such a move as letting down those who elected me." He subsequently pointed out that while on the board, he had pushed for greater transparency regarding the Wikimedia Foundation's controversial Knowledge Engine project and its financing, and indicated that his attempts to make public the Knight Foundation grant for the engine had been a factor in his dismissal.

The volunteer community re-elected him to the Wikimedia Foundation board in 2017, until November 2021.

=== Other ===
In 2012, Heilman was one of two Wikimedia contributors sued by Internet Brands for shifting freely licensed content and volunteer editors from the for-profit site Wikitravel to the non-profit site Wikivoyage. The Wikimedia Foundation defended Heilman's actions in the lawsuit, citing volunteer freedom of choice. In February 2013, the parties settled their litigation. In 2014, Heilman criticized a study which concluded that nine out of ten Wikipedia medical articles contained errors. In 2015, the Atlantic ran a piece about conflict-of-interest editing on Wikipedia which detailed Heilman's efforts to counteract edits made by employees of Medtronic to the Wikipedia page for percutaneous vertebroplasty. In 2017, Vice also ran an article about conflict-of-interest editing on Wikipedia, in which the author noted that Heilman had vocally called on the Wikimedia Foundation to increase its enforcement of Wikipedia's policy against undisclosed paid editing.

== Personal life ==
Heilman enjoys running ultramarathons and adventure racing. He and his girlfriend ran the Gobi March in 2008. He has also run the Marathon des Sables, the Adventure Racing World Championships, and the Saskatchewan Marathon.

== Wikipedia-related publications ==
- James Heilman; Eckhard Kemmann; Michael Bonert; Anwesh Chatterjee; et al. (2011). "Wikipedia: a key tool for global public health promotion". Journal of Medical Internet Research. 13 (1) e14. doi:10.2196/JMIR.1589. ISSN 1438-8871. PMC 3221335. PMID 21282098.
- Heilman, James (September 2011). "Why we should all edit Wikipedia" (PDF). University of British Columbia Medical Journal. 3 (1): 32–33.
- Manu E Mathew; Anna Joseph; James M. Heilman; Prathap Tharyan (October 22, 2013). "Cochrane and Wikipedia: The Collaborative Potential for a Quantum Leap in the Dissemination and Uptake of Trusted Evidence". Cochrane Database of Systematic Reviews. doi:10.1002/14651858.ED000069. ISSN 1469-493X. PMC 10846362. PMID 24475488. Archived from the original on October 18, 2014.
- James Heilman; Jacob de Wolff; Graham Beards; Brian Basden (October 2, 2014). "Dengue fever: a Wikipedia clinical review". Open Medicine. 8 (4): e105-15. ISSN 1911-2092. PMC 4242787. PMID 25426178.
- James M Heilman; Andrew G West (March 4, 2015). "Wikipedia and medicine: quantifying readership, editors, and the significance of natural language". Journal of Medical Internet Research. 17 (3) e62. doi:10.2196/JMIR.4069. ISSN 1438-8871. PMC 4376174. PMID 25739399.
- James Heilman (August 2015). "Open Access to a High-Quality, Impartial, Point-of-Care Medical Summary Would Save Lives: Why Does It Not Exist?". PLOS Medicine. 12 (8) e1001868. doi:10.1371/JOURNAL.PMED.1001868. ISSN 1549-1277. PMC 4549298. PMID 26305335.
- Amin N Azzam; David E. Bresler; Armando J. Leon; et al. (September 13, 2016). "Why Medical Schools Should Embrace Wikipedia: Final-Year Medical Student Contributions to Wikipedia Articles for Academic Credit at One School". Academic Medicine. 92 (2): 194–200. doi:10.1097/ACM.0000000000001381. ISSN 1040-2446. PMC 5265689. PMID 27627633. S2CID 24613560.
- Gwinyai Masukume; Lisa Kipersztok; Diptanshu Das; Thomas Shafee; Michaël R. Laurent; James M Heilman (November 1, 2016). "Medical journals and Wikipedia: a global health matter". The Lancet Global Health. 4 (11) e791. doi:10.1016/S2214-109X(16)30254-6. hdl:10468/3220. ISSN 2214-109X. PMID 27765289.
- Thomas Shafee; Gwinyai Masukume; Lisa Kipersztok; Diptanshu Das; Mikael Häggström; James Heilman (August 28, 2017). "Evolution of Wikipedia's medical content: past, present and future" (PDF). Journal of Epidemiology and Community Health. 71 (11): 1122–1129. doi:10.1136/JECH-2016-208601. ISSN 0143-005X. PMC 5847101. PMID 28847845.

== See also ==
- List of Wikipedia people
- Wikipedia coverage of the COVID-19 pandemic
