= Michal Rosen-Zvi =

Israeli educator, visionary speaker, researcher and doctor

- מיכל רוזן-צבי
- Education: Hebrew University, University of California, Berkeley, University of California Irvine
- Occupations: researcher, professor

Michal Rosen-Zvi (Hebrew: מיכל רוזן-צבי) is an Israeli academic and researcher in the fields of artificial intelligence and deep learning and their applications to healthcare. She is research director for Healthcare Informatics at IBM Research in Haifa.

== Education and career ==
External videos
- Dr. Michal Rosen-Zvi, Addressing Special Health Needs Via Personalized Systems that Learn from Data, HIT

After completing a PhD in computational physics at Bar-Ilan University, Rosen-Zvi pursued postdoctoral studies in machine learning at UC Berkeley, UC Irvine, and Hebrew University.

She has worked for IBM since 2005, and is director of healthcare informatics at IBM Research in Haifa. She has specialised in the fields of medical image analysis, machine learning, and cognitive computing, including creation of a structured dataset on governmental responses to the 2020 COVID-19 pandemic based on Wikipedia coverage. She is a member of the Israeli National Council of Digital Health and Innovation.

She has also taught at a number of colleges, including the Coller School of Management at Tel Aviv University and the Faculty of Medicine at Hebrew University.

== Research ==
Rosen-Zvi is known for her work in document classification, where she introduced the author–topic model. This is an extension of latent Dirichlet allocation, a method for understanding the word frequencies of documents by fitting them to a model in which a document is associated with a mixture of topics, each of which is a probability distribution over words. The author-topic model was introduced in a paper by Rosen-Zvi and three other authors in 2004. It adds the identity of document authors and their preferences for topics to the model, and became "one of the earliest attempts at modeling the interests of authors" used in this area of machine learning.

More recent research of Rosen-Zvi has focused on the application of machine learning techniques to problems in healthcare including medical diagnosis, choice of treatment, and causal inference in the observation of medical treatments and their outcomes.
