= Jaypee Brothers =

Medical publisher in New Delhi, India

Jaypee Brothers Medical Publishers
- Status: Active
- Founded: 1969
- Founder: Sohan Lal Vij
- Successor: Jitender P Vij
- Country of origin: India
- Headquarters location: New Delhi
- Distribution: NBN International (Europe); Baker & Taylor Publisher Services (US)
- Nonfiction topics: Medical
- Official website: www.jaypeebrothers.com

Jaypee Brothers is a medical publisher based in New Delhi, India. It was included on Beall's list of predatory open-access publishers before the list was taken down in 2017.

== Overview ==
Founded in 1969, Jaypee-The Health Sciences Publisher publishes books in almost all the areas of health science. Jaypee has more than 4000 titles in its active list, and publishes close to 300 new titles each year. The company has editorial and sales offices in India, London, Panama, and 700 employees. It publishes in 12 languages, and publishes nearly 30 Spanish titles annually from its office in Panama. All Jaypee English language books, videos and journals are also published digitally through its online platform.

== Controversy ==
In 2012, a Jaypee published a textbook titled Understanding and Management of Special Child in Pediatric Dentistry which was withdrawn from sale, after it was exposed by James Heilman to contain material that had been plagiarized from a Wikipedia article. Dr. Heilman said: "We do not mind if people publish our work. They do not even have to ask our permission, and they can try to make a profit off of it. They, however, cannot claim it as their own, and they must give us just a little bit of credit."
