= Berkshire Grey =

American technology company

Berkshire Grey, Inc.
- Type: Public
- Traded as: Nasdaq: BGRY
- Industry: Robotics and artificial intelligence
- Founded: 2013
- Founder: Tom Wagner
- Headquarters: Bedford, Massachusetts, United States
- Key people: Tom Wagner, Chairman & CEO
- Revenue: ▲US$50.852 Million (Fiscal Year Ended December 31, 2021)
- Operating income: ▼US$−164.339 Million (Fiscal Year Ended December 31, 2021)
- Net income: ▼US$−153.380 Million (Fiscal Year Ended December 31, 2021)
- Total assets: ▲US$216.684 Million (Fiscal Year Ended December 31, 2021)
- Total equity: ▲US$144.231 Million (Fiscal Year Ended December 31, 2021)
- Number of employees: 400 (December 2021)
- Website: www.berkshiregrey.com

Berkshire Grey, Inc. is an American technology company based in Bedford, Massachusetts that develops integrated artificial intelligence (“AI") and robotic solutions for e-commerce, retail replenishment, and logistics. The company's systems automate pick, pack and sort operations.

Berkshire Grey was founded by a group of 20 PhD's in the fields of embedded systems to motion planning.

== History ==
Berkshire Grey was founded in 2013 by Tom Wagner. He was previously chief technology officer of iRobot. The Chief Scientist for Berkshire Grey is Matthew T. Mason, former Director of the Robotics Institute at Carnegie Mellon University, and author of two highly cited textbooks on robotic manipulation. Mason was given the IEEE Robotics and Automation Award in 2018. The Berkshire Grey team is staffed with alumni from Uber, Kiva Systems, Tesla, and Carnegie Mellon University.

In December 2018, Berkshire Grey announced it had been selling AI-enabled robotics for retailers and logistics companies, automating tasks not previously performed by machines in commercial settings.

In August 2019, SoftBank announced it had struck a deal with Berkshire Grey. The deal secured $263 million in Series B funding, led by Softbank.

In February 2021, Berkshire Grey Inc. announced its plans to go public through a merger with special-purpose acquisition company Revolution Acceleration Acquisition Corp. (RAAC), bringing its valuation to $2.7 billion. Chief Executive of RAAC is John Delaney, a former member of the U.S. House of Representatives.

Berkshire Grey's customers include Walmart, Inc., Target Corp., and FedEx Corp. The company says its technology will help its customers to compete with Amazon, which has invested billions into automation.

Offering different robotics that include picking, gripping and image sensing, Berkshire Grey has more than 300 patents in the area. Insights lists 297 patents as granted since 2024.

Berkshire Grey plans to use contract manufacturing partners for the robot, camera and conveyor belt parts and then assemble them into a finished product with their own employees on-site at the customer location.

In March 2021, Berkshire Grey collaborated with CEVA Logistics to implement robotic automation systems at CEVA's Vancouver eCommerce facility. CEVA used Berkshire Grey's Robotic Product Sortation and Identification system to autonomously identify and sort eCommerce packages.

In 2024, Berkshire Grey agreed to merge with SoftBank Group Corp. in a cash deal worth $375 million.
