= Optellum =

- Type: Private
- Industry: Medical technology
- Founded: 28 October 2015
- Founders: Prof. Sir Michael Brady, Dr. Václav Potěšil, Dr. Timor Kadir, Dr. Jérôme Declerck, Dr. Lyndsey Pickup
- Key people: Dr. Johnathan Watkins (CEO), Prof. Sir Michael Brady (Founding Chair)
- Products: Virtual Nodule Clinic
- Website: optellum.com

Optellum is a British medical technology company that develops artificial intelligence (AI)-based clinical decision-support software for early lung cancer diagnosis and the early detection, management, and follow-up of incidental pulmonary nodules.

== History ==
Optellum was incorporated in October 2015 in the United Kingdom. It originated from research at the University of Oxford’s Computer Vision Laboratory, with the goal of applying machine learning to lung-nodule assessment and diagnosis. It was founded by four Oxford scientists and emeritus professor of oncological imaging at the University of Oxford, Sir Michael Brady

In 2022, Optellum raised US$14 million in Series A funding to expand operations in the UK and the United States and to accelerate deployment of their AI platform for lung cancer diagnosis.

== Products and technology ==
Optellum’s core platform, the Virtual Nodule Clinic, assists radiologists and pulmonologists in identifying and evaluating lung nodules. The software uses radiomics and machine learning algorithms to compute a Lung Cancer Prediction (LCP) score that estimates malignancy risk. The system also supports screening and management of incidental nodules, detecting high-risk nodules in CT scans performed for other clinical reasons such as emergency or cardiac evaluations, and enabling longitudinal tracking and follow-up of these patients.

The Virtual Nodule Clinic has received regulatory clearances in several jurisdictions, including U.S. FDA 510(k), CE Mark, and UKCA approval. It is associated with CPT® code 0721T for AI-based lung nodule risk assessment and management. In 2022, the U.S. Centers for Medicare & Medicaid Services (CMS) approved a national payment rate for the LCP score, enabling Medicare reimbursement. The platform has been deployed in healthcare systems such as AtlantiCare in New Jersey, which reported identifying multiple high-risk nodules through its use.

== Partnerships ==
In 2025, Optellum announced a collaboration with Bristol-Myers Squibb to implement its AI system across several U.S. healthcare networks to improve early lung cancer diagnosis. It has also partnered with GE HealthCare to expand AI integration into imaging and lung health solutions.

== See also ==
- Artificial intelligence in medicine
- Lung cancer screening
- Radiomics
- Kadir–Brady saliency detector
