= Ann Nicholson =

Australian computer scientist (born 1965)

Ann E. Nicholson
- Born: June 1965 (age 61); London, England
- Education: PhD, University of Oxford, 1992; MSc Computer Science, University of Melbourne, 1990; BSc (Hons) Computer Science, University of Melbourne, 1986
- Known for: Bayesian artificial intelligence
- Partner: Paul Konstanty (2000-2019)
- Children: 2
- Scientific career
- Fields: Computer science
- Workplaces: Monash University; Brown University
- Thesis: Monitoring Discrete Environments using Dynamic Belief Networks
- Doctoral advisor: J.M. Brady

Ann E. Nicholson (born June 1965) is an Australian academic specialising in computer science. She was the Dean in the Faculty of Information Technology at Monash University in Melbourne. She is a researcher in the specialised area of Bayesian networks.

Nicholson completed her BSc and MSc in Computer Science at the University of Melbourne. In 1988, she was awarded a Rhodes scholarship to Oxford. Here she did her doctorate in the Robotics Research Group. After starting work in the United States in 1992 as a post-doctoral research fellow at Brown University in Rhode Island, she took up a lecturing position at Monash University in 1994.

Nicholson has published more than 120 papers, with more than 7,000 citations, including co-authoring leading books in her specialised research area – Bayesian Artificial Intelligence.

Nicholson established the consulting company Bayesian Intelligence in 2007 and is currently serving as Honorary Secretary to the Victorian Rhodes Scholarship Selection Committee. In 2022 she was elected a Fellow of the Australian Academy of Technological Sciences and Engineering.
