= Wikipedia and the COVID-19 pandemic =

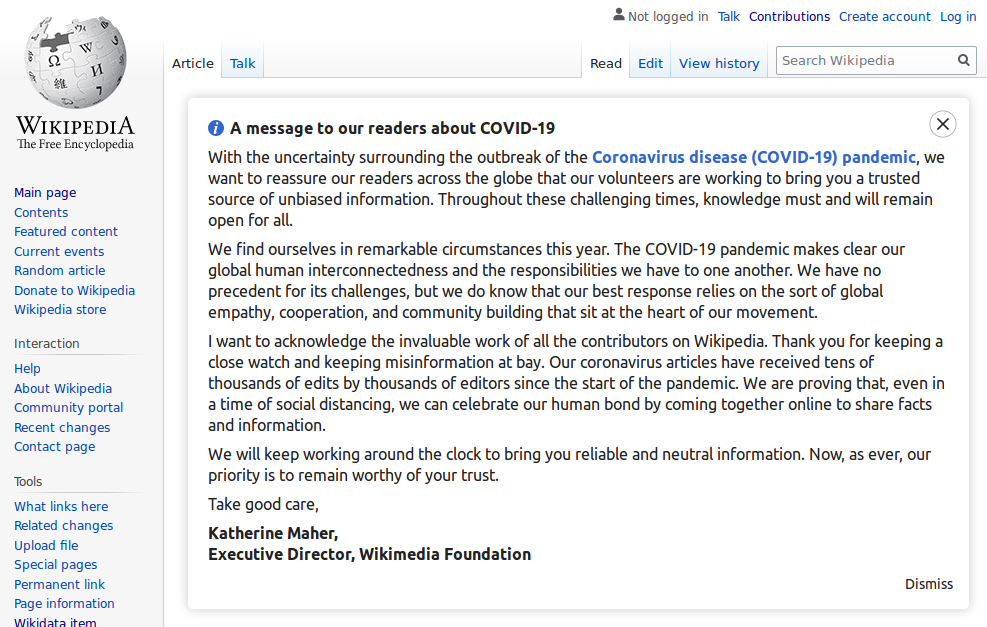
March 2020 message to the English Wikipedia's readers about COVID-19, written by Katherine Maher, then-executive director of the Wikimedia Foundation

The COVID-19 pandemic was covered on Wikipedia extensively, in real time, and across multiple languages. This coverage extends to many detailed articles about various aspects of the topic itself, as well as many existing articles being amended to take account of the pandemic's effect on them. Wikipedia and other Wikimedia projects' coverage of the pandemic—and how the volunteer editing community achieved that coverage—received widespread media attention for its comprehensiveness, reliability, and speed. Readership increased during the pandemic.

== Wikipedia ==
The Wikimedia Foundation reported that on all Wikipedias from 1 December 2019 to 8 December 2020, 6,950 articles related to COVID-19 had been created, and 983,395 edits had been made to COVID-19-related articles by 97,088 editors. Additionally, in the same one-year time frame, COVID-19 related articles across all Wikipedias received 579,190,316 pageviews. A 2021 study in Nature found that edits increased dramatically on most Wikipedias after the onset of the pandemic: larger Wikipedias, like the English Wikipedia, acquired many more newcomers, making the earlier pandemic period Wikipedia's most active period in the previous three years.

One study found that Wikipedia's coverage of the COVID-19 pandemic from January to May 2020 referenced trusted media sources and high-quality academic research. Another study observed that Wikipedia's traffic tended to match the intensity of other COVID-19 discussion in the media ecosystem, rather than the ongoing and steady severity of the pandemic. A December 2020 study showed that nearly two percent of COVID-19-related literature had been cited on Wikipedia.

In mid-March 2020, journalist Noam Cohen said that editors' work on articles related to the pandemic demonstrated "that Wikipedia has also developed a conscience." Cohen described how Wikipedia's efforts to combat misinformation related to the pandemic differed from some other major websites and opined, "Unless Twitter, Facebook and the others can learn to address misinformation more effectively, Wikipedia will remain the last best place on the Internet."

Wikipedia experienced an increase in readership during the COVID-19 pandemic. In April 2020, according to the newspaper Dawn, when reports of cases in Wuhan emerged in December 2019 at the start of the pandemic, Wikipedia editors averaged 163 edits per hour to COVID-related pages. Across 188 Wikipedia languages, there were nearly 7,000 articles related to the pandemic as of November 2021.

One of several infographics provided by the World Health Organization to Wikipedia; this one pertains to conspiracy theories about 5G, specifically those about COVID-19.

In his article "Why Wikipedia Is Immune to Coronavirus", Omer Benjakob of Haaretz wrote, "Wikipedia has stepped in to provide relief. So much so that it has become the go-to source for COVID-19 information." Editors have worked diligently to remove misinformation. The World Health Organization announced it was working with the Wikimedia Foundation to help freely license its infographics and other material on COVID-19 to help in the work's effort to fight misinformation related to COVID-19, with plans to do similar in the future for other infectious diseases.

Jevin West, a professor at the University of Washington Information School, said in August 2020 that Wikipedia has handled COVID-19 "overall, exceptionally well." In January 2021, the BBC remarked that in 2020, hundreds of Wikipedia editors had covered just about every aspect of the pandemic.

In June 2021, Jackson Ryan of CNET reported on Wikipedia's "endless war" over the COVID-19 lab leak hypothesis. Some editors were reported to have been caught setting up "sock puppet" accounts to reinforce their own point of view and push dubious sources. Other editors were reported to have expressed concerns about possible Chinese state actors suppressing discussion of the hypothesis, without providing definitive evidence. In July 2021, British science writer Matt Ridley criticized Wikipedia for "long bann[ing] any mention of the possibility that the virus leaked from a Wuhan laboratory." Ridley himself is a proponent of the lab leak hypothesis.

In a July 2021 The Atlantic article, writer Renée DiResta wrote about how the United States government's efforts to combat misinformation needed a "better system for communicating with the public." DiResta refers to Wikipedia as a good model for how this should be done, stating that "The crowdsourced reference site is the simplest, most succinct summary of the current state of knowledge on almost any subject you can imagine," and that this approach would allow "far more complete and up-to-date [information] than individual press releases."

In August 2021, Wikipedia co-founder Jimmy Wales wrote in Al Jazeera that "When the COVID-19 pandemic changed life as we know it, volunteer editors on Wikipedia acted in real-time to combat disinformation and ensure the world had access to science-based health resources, across 188 languages and every continent. Through an open, decentralised model, Wikipedians created unparalleled amounts of accurate, life-saving content."

=== English Wikipedia ===
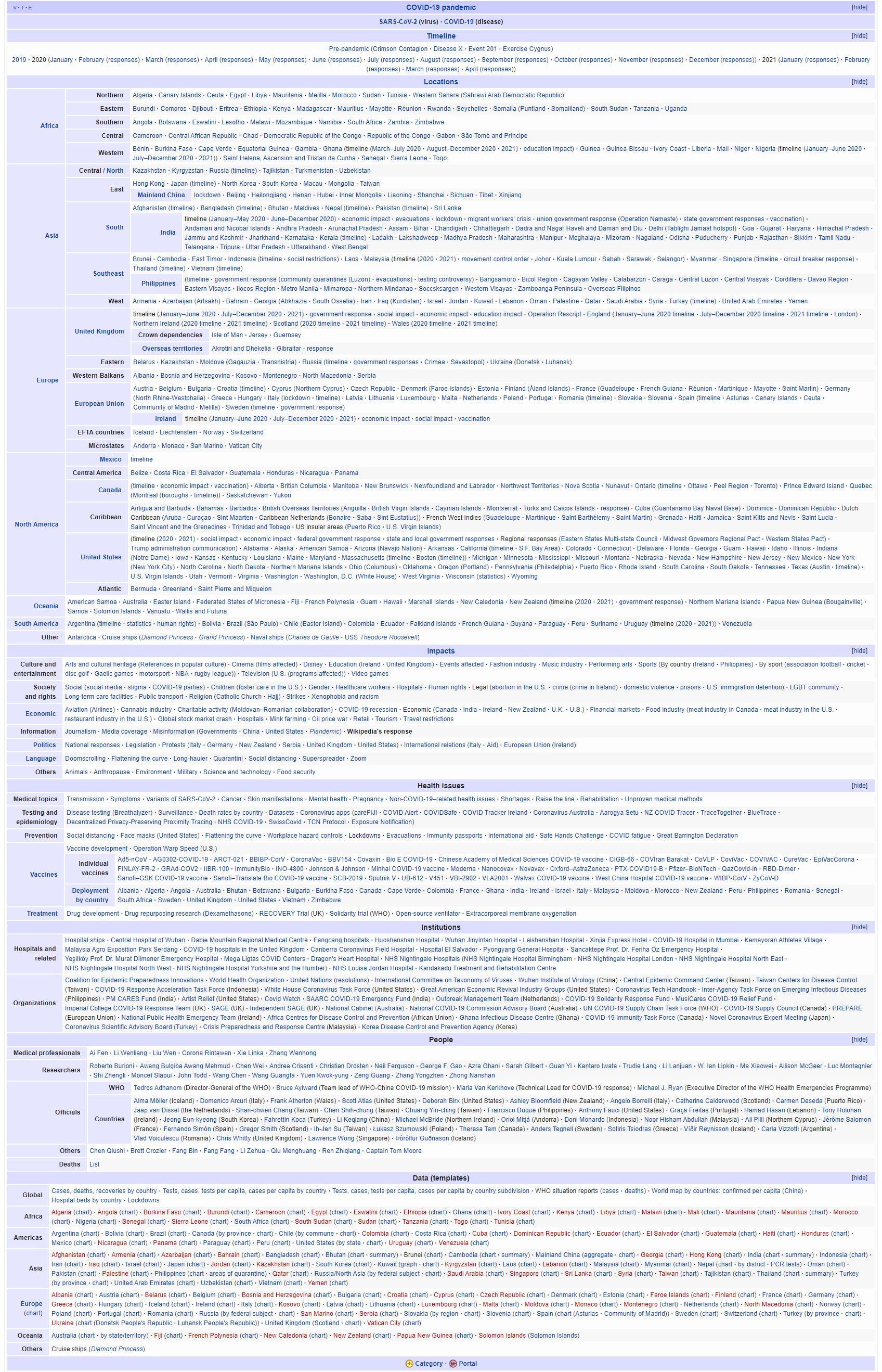
Screenshot of a template on the English Wikipedia displaying a collection of articles related to the COVID-19 pandemic, as of 3 April 2021

A year after its first creation, the main COVID-19 pandemic Wikipedia article in English had become the 34th most viewed article on the website of all time, with almost 32,000 inbound links from other articles, according to The New Republic. As of February 2023, Wikipedia's Top 100 most-viewed pages chart lists the article for the COVID-19 pandemic as the 65th most-viewed article ever and the article for Coronavirus as the 5th most-viewed life-related article ever.

The "2019–2020 China pneumonia outbreak" Wikipedia article, which evolved into the English Wikipedia's main article about the pandemic, was created on 5 January 2020 by a user from China. Wikipedia entries were subsequently created for "Severe acute respiratory syndrome coronavirus 2" and "Coronavirus disease 2019". By 9 February, the main article had been edited more than 6,500 times by approximately 1,200 editors, and six of the primary Wikipedia articles about the pandemic were viewed more than 18 million times. Other early entries included an overview of the pandemic by country and territory, a timeline, and another focused on xenophobia and racism. The Wikipedia pages about bats as food, the Corona beer brand, severe acute respiratory syndrome (SARS), and Wuhan also saw increased editing.

As the pandemic spread, editors worked to keep up with the barrage of new information and misinformation being added to the site. Information on Wikipedia was used to create data visualizations and shared on Reddit, Twitter, and other social media platforms. More than 2,100 editors had contributed to the main article about the pandemic by 19 March.

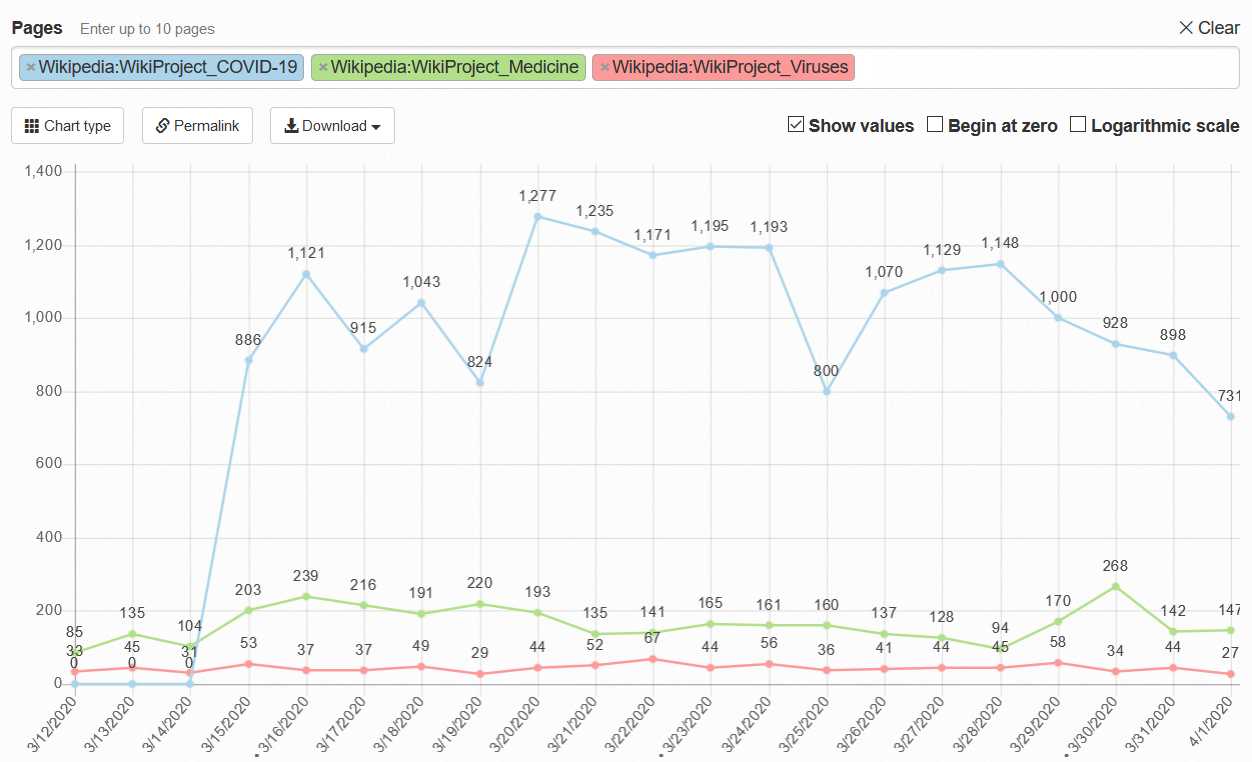
Viewership of WikiProject COVID-19, WikiProject Medicine, and WikiProject Viruses during March 2020

Editor affinity groups known as WikiProjects helped to supervise the English Wikipedia's pandemic coverage, monitoring articles for changes, offering feedback, enforcing rigorous source quality standards, and translating articles into Wikipedias of other languages. A new WikiProject dedicated to the disease and pandemic had 90 members by late March 2020. Prominent Wikipedia editors involved in these projects included James Heilman and Jason Moore.

Wikipedia editors deleted and later restored an entry called "2020 Tablighi Jamaat COVID-19 hotspot in Delhi", which project co-founder Jimmy Wales said "was incredibly poorly written and had zero sources". Wired's Omer Benjakob reports that prior to deletion, the article contained Islamophobic claims that the local Muslim community was the cause of the spread of the disease in India, along with claims that Muslims at a local medical center were seen "molesting nurses and spitting on hospital staff ... [and even] reportedly found defecating in the hospital corridor". Wales later responded to accusations on Twitter, stating that Wikipedia did not accept payment for the article's deletion.

Readership spikes have reflected significant developments in the disease's spread. "COVID-19 pandemic in Pakistan" saw a traffic spike in late March, with daily page views ranging from 80,000 to 100,000; the article ranked number 72 for the month's most read pages. In early April, Wikimedia projects received 673 million page views in a 24-hour period, the highest in five years. The English Wikipedia had 283 COVID-19 articles by then, with the main entry receiving more than 17,000 edits and 20 million views. Entries about the pandemic received 240 million views by 23 April 2020, with the page about misinformation related to the pandemic receiving an average of 14,000 views per day. A November 2021 study found that contributions to the English Wikipedia had increased by 20 percent due to COVID-19 restrictions.

=== German Wikipedia ===
There are hundreds of Wikipedia articles about the COVID-19 pandemic at German Wikipedia. Editors began writing about the pandemic in January 2020, when the outbreak was advancing in China. The main article about the pandemic and the entry for the disease's spread in Germany were being accessed approximately 150,000 and 100,000 times per day, respectively, as of March 2020.

=== Indian languages ===
Logo for WikiProject COVID-19 at Urdu Wikipedia

Wikipedia had COVID-19 information in several Indian languages by 27 March 2020, including Bangla, Bhojpuri, Hindi, Kannada, Malayalam, Odia, Tamil, Telugu, and Urdu. SWASTHA (acronym for Special Wikipedia Awareness Scheme for the Healthcare Affiliates), a division of WikiProject Medicine, is working with Johns Hopkins University, India's Ministry of Health and Family Welfare and National Health Authority, and the World Health Organization to improve coverage.

Urdu Wikipedia's entry for COVID-19 was viewed more than 12,000 times by 23 April 2020. The Odia Wikipedia's average monthly readership rose from about 800,000 before 2021 to two million afterwards. A representative from the Wikimedia Odia division said that the over 1,900 medical articles made the Odia Wikipedia "the most comprehensive source of medical content in Odia on the internet". Development of Wikipedia's coverage on COVID-19 led to public consideration among Indian people of Wikipedia's coverage of other topics.

=== Italian Wikipedia ===
A study found that during the COVID-19 pandemic users in Italy had increased readership on topics related to dieting. Another study found that the number of editors from Italy increased by 80 per cent following the start of lockdown measures in the country.

=== Japanese Wikipedia ===
There are over one hundred Wikipedia articles about the pandemic at the Japanese Wikipedia. The Wikipedia article "Abenomask" (アベノマスク) drew attention due to its deletion request. The word refers to a government plan involving reusable clothmasks. Some said that the name was an insult against Shinzo Abe, while others said that it was not an insult and showed usage in Sankei Shimbun, a conservative newspaper. The community decided that it should not be deleted.

=== Spanish Wikipedia ===
The main article about the pandemic at Spanish Wikipedia was created by an editor from Costa Rica on 19 January 2020. By mid April, the article had been edited more than 5,000 times, included 350 references, and received more than 5 million views. The entry was being monitored by approximately 175 editors at the time, receiving an average of 80,000 views per day.

== Wikidata ==
Wikidata, a knowledge database and sibling project of Wikipedia, has been used for COVID-19 research and databasing. BridgeDb, a project that connects bioinformatic identifiers, is creating COVID-19 gene and protein mapping databases from information supplied by Wikidata as part of a collaboration with Wikidata's WikiProject COVID-19. Peer-review journal Semantic Web wrote about using Wikidata as a semantic resource for COVID-19, writing, "The rich knowledge graph created for COVID-19 in Wikidata can be visualized, explored, and analyzed for purposes like decision support as well as educational and scholarly research." WikiProject India set up a task force on Wikidata and created a central database depicting the national and state-level trajectories of the spread.

== Wikimedia Foundation ==
The Wikimedia Foundation, the nonprofit organization that supports Wikimedia movement projects, including Wikipedia, had employees work remotely during lockdowns. The foundation published multiple free resources for at-home learning to assist with school closures. The foundation's then-executive director, Katherine Maher, encouraged editors and readers to work together to improve Wikipedia's coverage of COVID-19.

=== Wikimedian of the Year ===
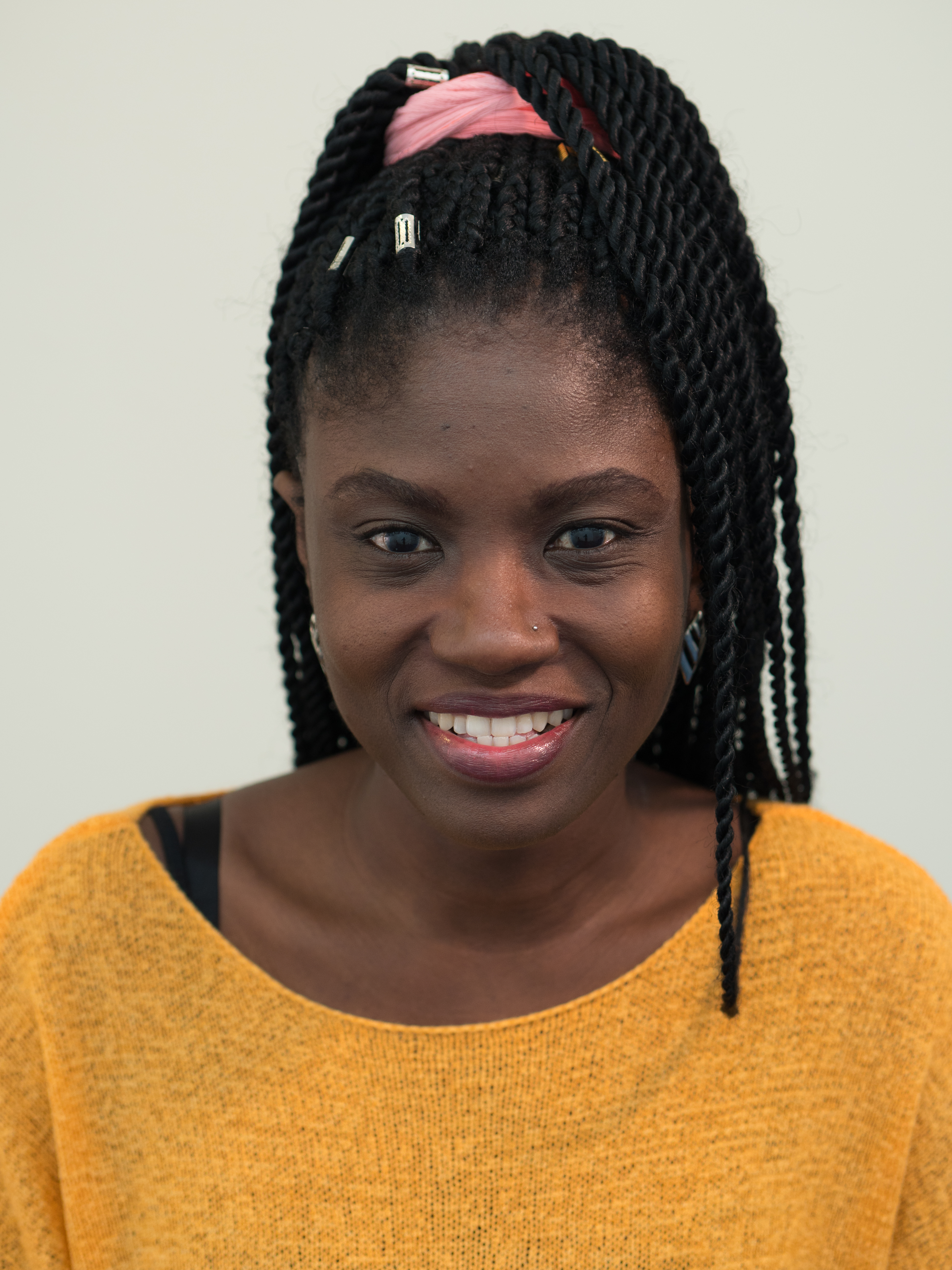
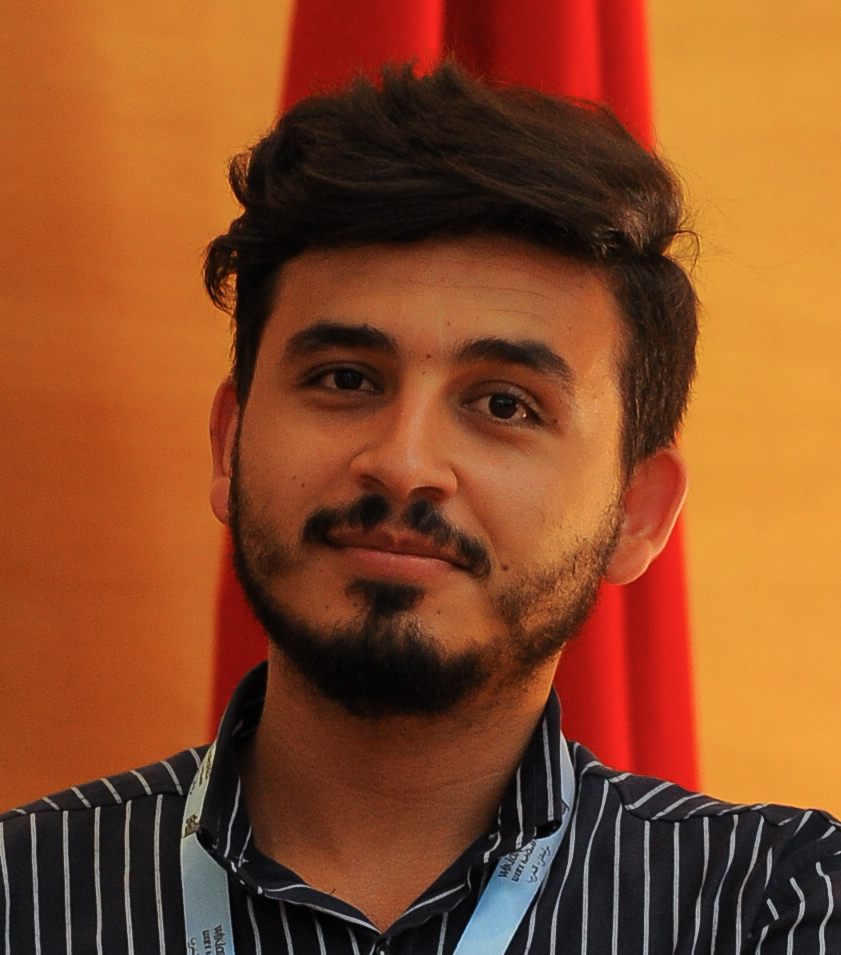
Sandister Tei (left) and Alaa Najjar (right), winners of the Wikimedian of the Year award in 2020 and 2021, respectively

The Wikimedia Foundation's annual Wikimedian of the Year award winners in 2020 and 2021 were attributed for their contribution to COVID-19-related content. The 2020 winner, Sandister Tei under the username Sandiooses, received the award for helping "pioneer the development of our volunteer communities in sub-Saharan Africa". The press release from the foundation details Tei's efforts to keep her User Group connected and contributing to articles about the pandemic's impact in Ghana. The 2021 winner, Alaa Najjar under the username علاء, received the award for "[his] significant contributions to Arabic Wikipedia represent a care and a commitment to neutrality and accuracy that have encouraged a high standard of quality information on Wikipedia". The foundation's press release highlights his leadership on the creation of COVID-19-related articles on the Arabic Wikipedia, contributing majorly to WikiProject Medicine and "providing critical access to life-saving information in his community and around the world."

== See also ==
- Health information on Wikipedia
