= Paul K. Wright =

Mechanical engineer

Paul Kenneth Wright is a mechanical engineer best known for his work on the UC Berkeley-based CyberCut/CyberBuild project, which established a set of standards that streamlined the conversion of creative manufacturing designs into rapid prototyping. Wright's NYU research group (led by Israel Greenfeld, Fred Hansen, and Louie Pavlakos) is also known for developing the first open-architecture control-of-manufacturing systems, and for developing Internet-based CAD/CAM systems.

== CITRIS and other positions ==
Wright was the director of the Center for Information Technology in the Interest of Society (CITRIS), a four-campus University of California research institute that applies information technology to large-scale societal problems. Wright also holds the A. Martin Berlin Chair in the University of California at Berkeley's Mechanical Engineering Department. He is co-director of the Berkeley Manufacturing Institute (BMI) and co-director of the Berkeley Wireless Research Center (BWRC). From 1995 to 2005 Wright was the co-chair of the Management of Technology Program, a multi-disciplinary program at UC Berkeley dedicated to bringing high-tech products to the marketplace.

== Education ==
He born in London, in 1947, Wright earned his B.Sc. and Ph.D. from the University of Birmingham, England. He came to the United States in 1979 following appointments at the University of Auckland, in New Zealand, and Cambridge University, in England.

== Publications and awards ==
Wright is author or co-author of more than 200 journal and conference articles and is co-author, with David A. Bourne, of the book Manufacturing Intelligence. Wright also co-authored the book Metal Cutting with E. M. Trent. His book 21st Century Manufacturing won the Society of Manufacturing Engineers Eugene M. Merchant Book of the Year Award in 2001.

== Memberships ==
Wright became a member of the National Academy of Engineering in 2007, a Fellow of the American Society of Mechanical Engineers in 2003; and a Fellow of the Society of Manufacturing Engineers in 1998.

== Current research ==
His current research focuses on energy scavenging and storage for micro-scale motes, smart materials, design and manufacturing for micro-integration of 'intelligent objects," and the applications of wireless sensor systems. For example, beginning in 2002, following California's electricity crisis, CITRIS and Lawrence Berkeley National Laboratory researchers worked on Demand Response (DR) with the California Energy Commission [through its Public Interest Energy Research (PIER) program and the California Institute for Energy and the Environment (CIEE)] to create a multi-disciplinary team of architects, engineers, and user-interface specialists. Working with colleagues David Auslander and Dick White, Wright was part of the group that created a reference design for open system programmable communicating thermostats (PCTs). Combined with related work on smart sensors, and grid-level IT techniques, Demand Response (DR) can reduce peak-load consumption behaviors using time-of-use and critical peak pricing.
