= TreadPort Active Wind Tunnel =

The TreadPort Active Wind Tunnel (also known as the TPAWT) is a unique immersive virtual environment that integrates locomotion interfaces with sensory cues such as visual, auditory, olfactory, radiant heat and wind display. The TPAWT augments the Sarcos Treadport consisting of the Cave automatic virtual environment(CAVE) with a subsonic wind tunnel built around the user environment, and adds wind to the virtual environment. The Treadport Active Wind Tunnel is one of the first virtual environments to include wind into the sensory experience of the user. Other systems considering wind display, directly use fans.
