= Presence: Teleoperators & Virtual Environments =

Presence: Virtual and Augmented Reality
- Discipline: Computer Science, [[Engineering], [Psychology], [Human Factors], []]
- Language: English
- Edited by: Eugene Ch'ng

Publication details
- History: 1992-present
- Publisher: MIT Press (United States)
- Frequency: Bimonthly
- Impact factor: 0.750 (2016)

Standard abbreviations
- ISO 4: Presence

Indexing
- ISSN: 1054-7460 (print); 1531-3263 (web)
- OCLC no.: 39084170

Links
- Journal homepage

PRESENCE: Virtual and Augmented Reality is the longest-established peer-reviewed academic journal that is devoted to research into teleoperation and virtual environments (3D virtual reality worlds), PRESENCE: Virtual and Augmented Reality (previously PRESENCE: Teleoperators & Virtual Environments) publishes material about fundamental research into topics such as presence, augmented reality, haptics, user interfaces, and virtual humans, and applications that range from heritage and education to training simulators, healthcare, and entertainment.

PRESENCE was founded in 1992 and is published online and in hard copy by the MIT Press. According to the Journal Citation Reports, the journal has a 2016 impact factor of 0.750.

== Editors-In-Chiefs ==
- Eugene Ch'ng (Current)
- Albert “Skip” Rizzo
- Roy Ruddle
- Janet M. Weisenberger
- Mel Slater
- Nat Durlach
