= College of Psychologists of British Columbia =

The College of Psychologists of British Columbia is the regulatory body for psychologists in the province of British Columbia (BC), Canada. They are responsible for:

- Processing of applications for registration as a psychology practitioner in BC. They maintain a website that enables verification of registration with the College.
- Investigating of complaints related to a psychologist’s practice and conduct
- Quality assurance
