= Michael Brady (biomedical engineer) =

Researcher in medical-image analysis

Professor Sir Michael Brady FRS FMedSci FREng
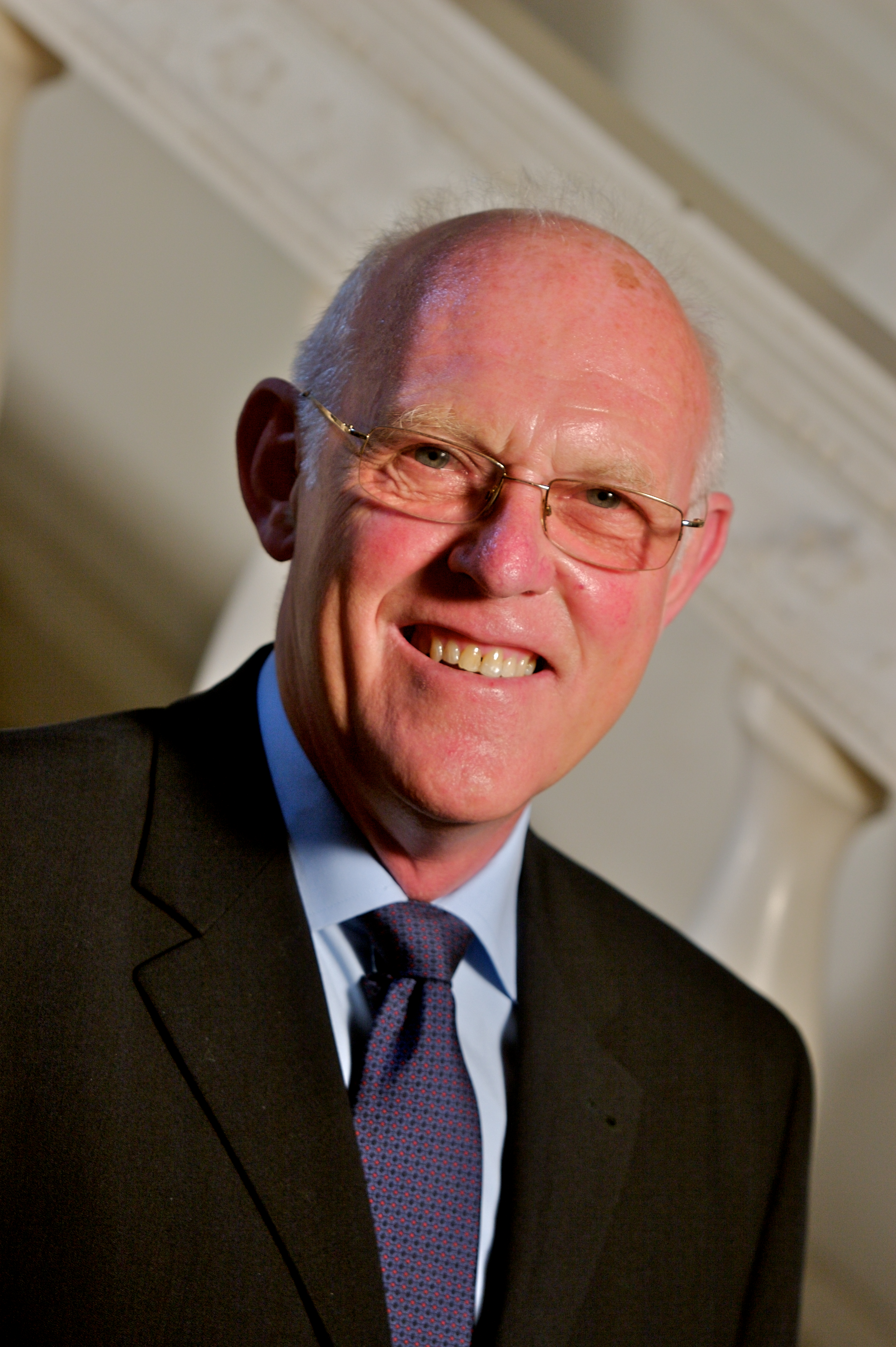
- Born: John Michael Brady; 30 April 1945 (age 81)
- Education: University of Manchester (BSc, MSc); Australian National University (PhD)
- Known for: Kadir–Brady saliency detector
- Awards: AAAI Fellow (1990); Faraday Medal (2000); Knight Bachelor (2004); Turing Lecture (2009)
- Scientific career
- Fields: Medical imaging; Computer vision
- Workplaces: University of Oxford; Massachusetts Institute of Technology; University of Essex; Oxford Instruments; AEA Technology
- Thesis: Just-non-cross varieties of groups (1970)
- Doctoral advisor: László György Kovács
- Doctoral students: David Forsyth; Ann Nicholson; Alison Noble; Demetri Terzopoulos
- Website: www.oncology.ox.ac.uk/research/mike-brady

Sir John Michael Brady (born 30 April 1945) is an emeritus professor of oncological imaging at the University of Oxford. He has been a Fellow of Keble College, Oxford, since 1985 and was elected a foreign associate member of the French Academy of Sciences in 2015. He was formerly BP Professor of Information Engineering at Oxford from 1985 to 2010 and a senior research scientist in the MIT Computer Science and Artificial Intelligence Laboratory (CSAIL) in Cambridge, Massachusetts, from 1980 to 1985.

== Education ==
Brady was educated in the School of Mathematics at the University of Manchester, where he was awarded a first class Bachelor of Science degree in mathematics in 1966 followed by a Master of Science degree in 1968. He went on to study at the Australian National University, where he was awarded a Doctor of Philosophy degree in 1970 for research into group theory supervised by László György Kovács.

== Research and career ==
Brady is an authority in the field of image analysis, initially working on shape analysis while at MIT, then on robotics, but most of all with an emphasis on medical image analysis. At MIT he worked on: the multiscale representation of the bounding contours of shapes (the curvature primal sketch), with Haruo Asada (Toshiba); two dimensional shapes (smoothed local symmetries), with Jon Connell; and the application of differential geometry to three-dimensional data, with Jean Ponce and Demetri Terzopoulos. He also worked on texture with Alan Yuille. He also worked with John M. Hollerbach, Tomàs Lozano-Pérez, and Matt Mason on robotics, who together published an early influential collection of articles and founded a seminal series of conferences.

Arriving in Oxford in 1985, he established the Robotics Laboratory and recruited Andrew Blake, Andrew Zisserman, Stephen Cameron, Hugh Durrant-Whyte, Lionel Tarassenko, Alison Noble, and David Murray.

Brady had begun to switch from robotics to medical imaging, specifically breast cancer, in 1989, following the death of his mother-in-law from the disease. Since then, he has worked with Ralph Highnam, first supervising Ralph's thesis, then co-authoring a monograph Mammographic Image Analysis.

Brady is the Interim President of the world's first Artificial Intelligence-based (AI) University: Mohamed bin Zayed University of Artificial Intelligence (MBZUAI), in Abu Dhabi, United Arab Emirates.

Brady's work in image analysis, specifically medical image analysis, has been wide-ranging and he has contributed algorithms for image segmentation, image registration and feature detection. With Timor Kadir and Andrew Zisserman he introduced the influential Kadir–Brady saliency detector at the European Conference on Computer Vision in 2004. During his research career, Brady has supervised students including Alison Noble, David Forsyth, and Demetri Terzopoulos.

Outside of academia, Brady has been involved with numerous start-up companies in the field of medical imaging including Matakina and ScreenPoint (mammographic image analysis), Mirada Medical (medical image fusion) and Perspectum Diagnostics (magnetic resonance imaging of the liver) which he cofounded in 2012 with Dr Rajarshi Banerjee in Oxford, England. In 2015, he along with other 4 Oxford scientists co-founded Optellum, a British medical technology company that develops artificial intelligence (AI)-based clinical decision-support software for early lung cancer diagnosis and to support the detection, management and follow-up of incidental pulmonary nodules.

== Awards and honours ==
Brady was elected a Fellow of the Royal Academy of Engineering (FREng) in 1992.

He was made a Fellow of the Royal Society (FRS) in 1997. His FRS certificate of election reads:

Distinguished for his work in artificial intelligence and its application to the visual guidance of robot manipulators and vehicles. He was one of the first information scientists to apply (David) Marr's ideas on human vision to the engineering problems of computer vision. His pioneer work on the automatic transcription of handwritten coding sheets demonstrated the need for visual representations at many levels of description, and led to the first working theory of the early visual processes involved in human reading. His work on the shapes of three-dimensional surfaces imaginatively combined ideas from group theory, descriptive differential geometry and the optimal interpretation of noisy measurements. His work in robot vision has demonstrated the paramount importance of computational stability in the algorithms used for integrating the information from successive images, and has shown how the performance of conventional stereo algorithms can be equalled in efficiency and reliability by the matching of distinctive curves. He has recently applied the techniques of stereo and photometric stereo to the monitoring of glaucoma development, and is actively involved in other medical applications. Through the work of his research groups, in both the UK and the USA, he has been a pioneer in the push towards the hardware demonstration of robots with diverse sensory capabilities. In this way, and through the scientific journals he has founded and/or edited, he has exerted a major influence over the development of robotics and artificial intelligence, particularly robot vision.

Brady was knighted in the 2004 New Year Honours for services to engineering. He delivered the Turing Lecture in 2009.

He was also awarded the Faraday Medal from the Institution of Electrical Engineers (IEE) in 2000, the Millennium Medal from the Institute of Electrical and Electronics Engineers (IEEE) in 2000. He was elected a Founding Fellow of the Association for the Advancement of Artificial Intelligence in 1990 and a Fellow of the Academy of Medical Sciences (FMedSci) in 2008.

Brady was awarded Honorary Doctorates at the University of Essex (1996), University of Manchester (1998) the University of Southampton(1999) the University of Liverpool (1999), the Paul Sabatier University (Toulouse) (2000), Oxford Brookes University (2006), and the University of York, and Changsha and Chongqing.

In 2007, he was appointed a commissioner of the Royal Commission for the Exhibition of 1851.
