= Wikimedia New York City =

Chapter of the Wikimedia Foundation

- The chapter's logo
- Formation: 2009; 17 years ago
- Type: 501(c)(3), Public charity
- Tax ID no.: 27-0520584
- Legal status: Charity
- Location: New York City, New York, U.S.
- Region served: New York metropolitan area
- Members: ~400 (2025)
- Executive Director: Pacita Rudder
- Website: nyc.wikimedia.org

Wikimedia New York City (WMNYC) is a chapter of the Wikimedia Foundation based in New York City, in the U.S. state of New York. Established in 2009, WMNYC is one of two recognized WMF chapters in the United States. There were approximately 400 members in 2025.

== Activities ==
WMNYC hosted "Wikipedia Loves Art" in 2009. WMNYC has co-hosted events with the New York Public Library. "Wikipedia! The Musical!" was held at the Library for the Performing Arts in 2011 to improve Wikipedia's coverage of musical theatre and "Wiki Gangs of New York" was held at the Main Branch in 2012 to improve coverage of New York on the encyclopedia. Such edit-a-thons had become a staple for the Chapter.

The edit-a-thon at the Solomon R. Guggenheim Museum focused on museum architecture in 2014. The museum held another event in 2015. Chapter volunteers supported an edit-a-thon at the Museum of Modern Art in 2015, in collaboration with the advocacy groups AfroCrowd and Black Lunch Table. The seven-hour event, which focused on improving Wikipedia's coverage of Latin American art and culture, offered no-cost child care and lunch. Chapter members helped at an edit-a-thon at the New York Botanical Garden's LuEsther T. Mertz Library in 2017. The event aimed to "[create] and [enhance] Wikipedia articles about women in science, specifically biographical articles of female ethnobotanists, plant taxonomists, and plant collectors", using the library's special collections.

In 2018, WMNYC co-organized an edit-a-thon at the Asian American Writers' Workshop to improve Wikipedia's coverage of Asian American organizations and writers. A second event followed in 2019 for Asian American and Pacific Islander Heritage Month. In 2019, the chapter and New York University Libraries partnered with the Latinx Project at New York University to host "Latinx Interventions", an edit-a-thon focused on Latinx culture and history.

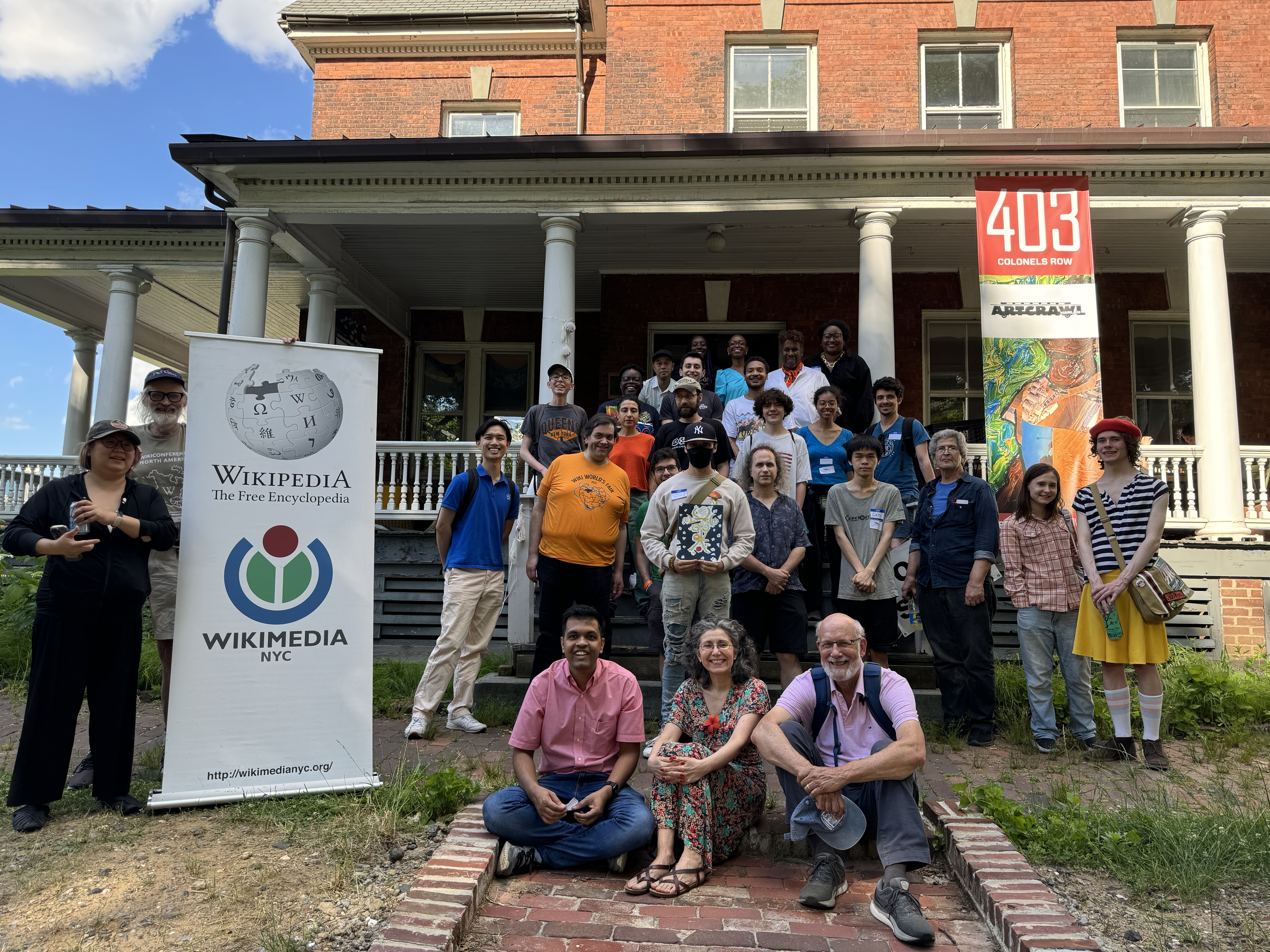
Meetup participants at a Wiknic on Governors Island in 2024

In May 2020, WMNYC hosted a symposium about Wikipedia and the COVID-19 pandemic. The chapter supported an Art+Feminism edit-a-thon at the Metropolitan Museum of Art in conjunction with Women's History Month in 2021. WMNYC co-hosted an edit-a-thon at the Queens Public Library to improve Wikipedia's coverage of Queens in 2024.

In 2025, the chapter and the City University of New York (CUNY) announced a Wikimedian in residence (WiR) would work with faculty, staff, and students make research findings more available to the general public and contribute to Wikimedia Foundation (WMF) projects. The position is held by Richard Knipel, who was previously a WiR for the Guggenheim Museum, the Metropolitan Museum of Art, and the Museum of Modern Art. The program is being funded by Craig Newmark, namesake of CUNY's Graduate School of Journalism. WMNYC's editor recruitment series Wikicurious is funded by Craig Newmark Philanthropies. Trainings have been held in the cities of Austin, Charlotte, Dallas, and Miami.

=== WikiConference North America ===
WMNYC and the WMF chapter for the Washington metropolitan area co-hosted the second WikiConference USA (now WikiConference North America) at Washington, D.C.'s National Archives Building in 2015, in collaboration with the Wiki Education Foundation and the National Archives and Records Administration. WMNYC hosted WikiConference North America in New York City in October 2025, with financial assistance from the WMF. The event commemorated the 400th anniversary of the Dutch founding of Fort Amsterdam with the "NYC400" campaign, which "invited people to nominate 400 people and places associated with the city that don't yet have their own pages".

=== Wikipedia Day ===
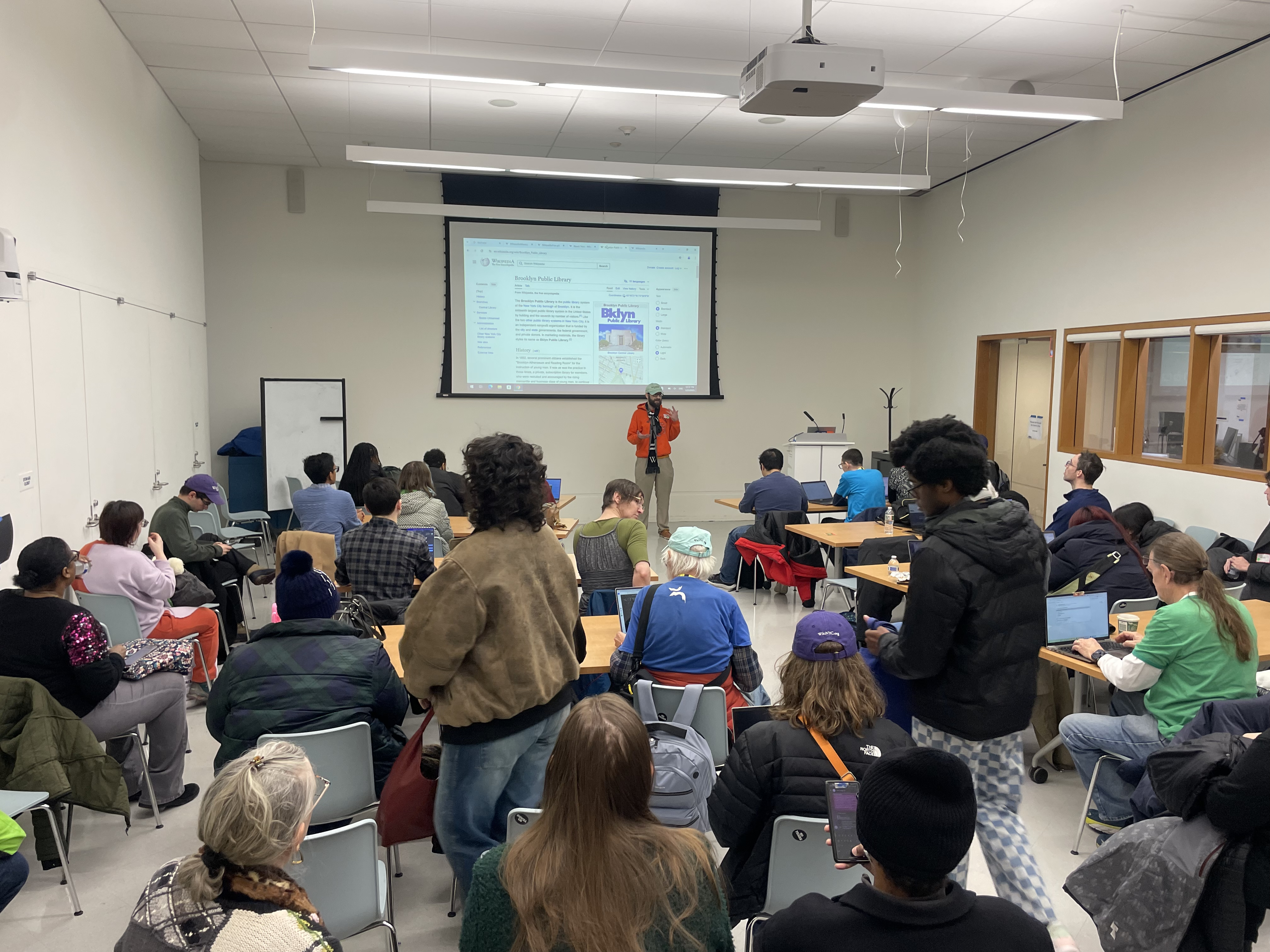
Wikipedia Day attendees at the Brooklyn Public Library in 2025

In 2018, approximately 150 people attended WMNYC's "all day celebration and mini-conference" Wikipedia Day at the Ace Hotel in Manhattan to commemorate Wikipedia's seventeenth anniversary.

In 2025, Wikipedia Day was held at the Brooklyn Public Library. The event coincided with the launch of the chapter's "400 neighborhoods and 400 New Yorkers" campaign to improve Wikipedia's coverage of local individuals and neighborhoods. Approximately 1,200 people confirmed interest via RSVP. According to Slate, WMNYC had an emergency and safety manual for staff and volunteers. The event was livestreamed and in-person attendees could use pseudonyms or wear stickers to avoid being photographed.

The 2026 event was held at the City Tech campus in downtown Brooklyn. Artificial intelligence was a major topic of discussion, according to the Brooklyn Eagle.

== Membership and leadership ==
There were approximately 400 members in 2025. The New York Times has said: "Members, who range in age from approximately 16 to 88 and work as academics, lawyers, photographers, recycling technicians and more, meet about once a month to socialize and share projects they’re working on. Around twice a month, they also participate in events geared toward training new editors."

Knipel was the chapter's president in 2011–2012, 2015, 2017, and 2023. He was a member of the board of directors in 2024. Megan Wacha was a board member in 2017 and held the president role in 2018 and 2021. Pacita Rudder is the executive director.

== See also ==
- List of Wikimedia chapters
