= Racial bias on Wikipedia =

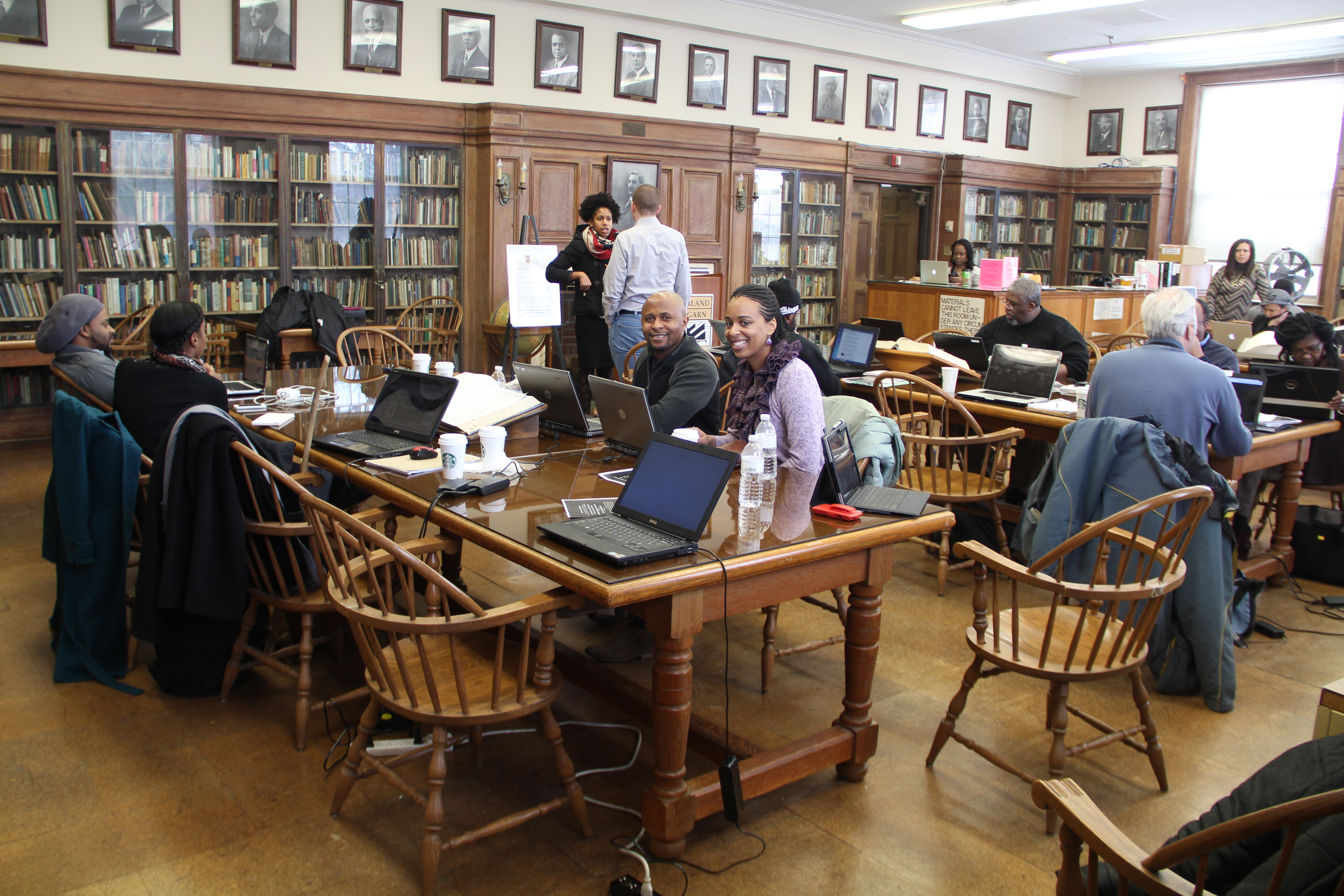
Edit-a-thon for Black History Month at Howard University, a historically-Black university

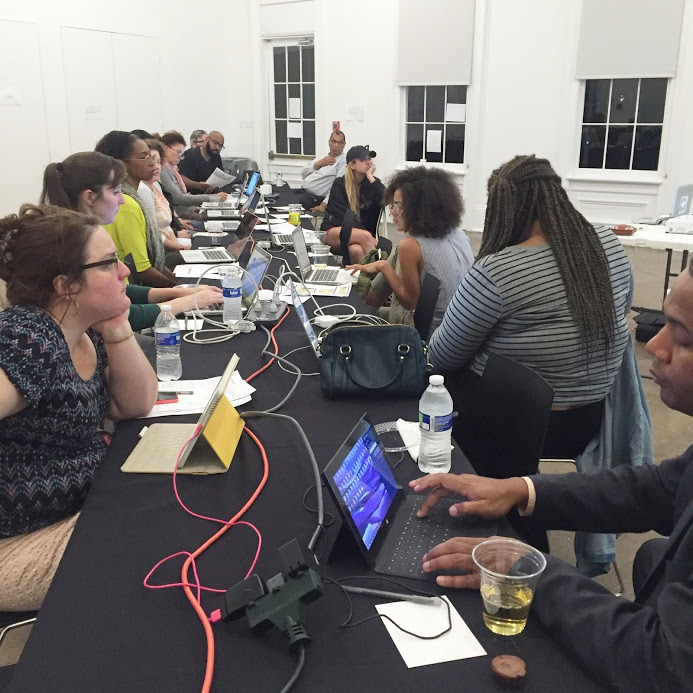
Edit-a-thon for Visual Artists of the African Diaspora at the Joan Mitchell Center, hosted by Black Lunch Table in New Orleans

The English Wikipedia has been criticized for having a systemic racial bias in its coverage. This bias partially stems from an under-representation of people of color within its volunteer editor base. In "Can History Be Open Source? Wikipedia and the Future of the Past," it is noted that article completeness and coverage is dependent on the interests of Wikipedians, not necessarily on the subject matter itself. The past president of Wikimedia D.C., James Hare, asserted that "a lot of [Black American history] is left out" of Wikipedia, due to articles predominately being written by white editors. Articles about African topics that do exist are, according to some, largely edited by editors from Europe and North America and thus, they only reflect their knowledge and their consumption of media, which "tend to perpetuate a negative image" of Africa. Maira Liriano of the Schomburg Center for Research in Black Culture has argued that the lack of information regarding Black history on Wikipedia "makes it seem like it's not important." Different theories have been provided to explain these racial discrepancies. Jay Cassano, writing for Fast Company magazine, argued that Wikipedia's small proportion of Black editors is a result of the small Black presence within the technology sector, and a relative lack of reliable access to the internet. Katherine Maher, executive director of the Wikimedia Foundation, has argued that the specific focuses in Wikipedia's content are representative of those of society as a whole. She said that Wikipedia could only represent that which was referenced in secondary sources, which historically have been favorable towards and focused on white men. "Studies have shown that content on Wikipedia suffers from the bias of its editors – [who are] mainly technically inclined, English-speaking, white-collar men living in majority-Christian, developed countries in the Northern hemisphere."

In addition to the racial bias on Wikipedia, public encyclopedias are generally vulnerable to vandalism by hate groups.

== Research findings and analysis ==
A challenge for editors who are trying to add Black history articles to Wikipedia is the requirement that potential article topics, such as historical individuals or events, meet Wikipedia's "notability" criteria. Sara Boboltz of HuffPost wrote that the Wikipedia notability criteria "is a troubling problem for those fighting for more content about women and minorities", because "there's simply less [published] documentation on many accomplished women and minorities throughout history – they were often ignored, after all, or forced to make their contributions as someone else's assistant." Furthermore, the work of researching and including suppressed racialized voices is a labor that is mostly done by Wikipedia editors who are themselves oppressed, creating a further burden for them.

Maher stated that one issue is that "content on Wikipedia has to be backed up by secondary sources, sources that she says throughout history have contained a bias toward white men;" "people of color have not been represented in mainstream knowledge creation or inclusion in that knowledge," as "encyclopedias of old were mostly written by European men."

The racial bias on Wikipedia works towards a reinforcement of racist beliefs of the readers, but conversely, a reparation of that bias could develop more empathy in the readers for racialized people. Efforts towards addressing bias have thus far created some space for white women, but not racialized or otherwise oppressed people.

According to Peter Reynosa, "there is an underrepresentation of Latinos who write for Wikipedia," and as a result "many topics may remain uncovered, or at the least these topics will not be given the attention they deserve."

In 2018, the Southern Poverty Law Center (SPLC) criticized Wikipedia for being "vulnerable to manipulation by neo-Nazis, white nationalists and racist academics seeking a wider audience for extreme views." According to the SPLC:

"Civil POV-pushers can disrupt the editing process by engaging other users in tedious and frustrating debates or tie up administrators in endless rounds of mediation. Users who fall into this category include racialist academics and members of the human biodiversity, or HBD, blogging community... In recent years, the proliferation of far-right online spaces, such as white nationalist forums, alt-right boards and HBD blogs, has created a readymade pool of users that can be recruited to edit on Wikipedia en masse... The presence of white nationalists and other far-right extremists on Wikipedia is an ongoing problem that is unlikely to go away in the near future given the rightward political shift in countries where the majority of the site's users live".

— SPLC, 12 March 2018

The SPLC cited the article Race and intelligence as an example of the alt-right influence on Wikipedia, stating that at that time the article presented a "false balance" between fringe racialist views and the "mainstream perspective in psychology."

In June 2020, Wikipedia was described in Slate as a "Battleground for Racial Justice" in response to criticisms of neutrality, coverage of George Floyd and his murder, Black Lives Matter, and article deletion nominations for one of the founders of Black Birders Week.

According to Bjork-James, the racial bias of Wikipedia results not only in the underrepresentation of racialized people and knowledge, but also in the racist mischaracterization of historical and social phenomena which involve people other than whites. This means that the fixing of Wikipedia's racial bias cannot be achieved by the mere addition of more specialized content. Rather, it necessitates shifts in the presentation of many general-knowledge topics. Bjork-James writes that Wikipedia needs to broaden its use of reliable sources to include the large number of peer-reviewed academic publications in recent decades that endeavor to correct the Western orientation of most traditional sources.

== Responses ==
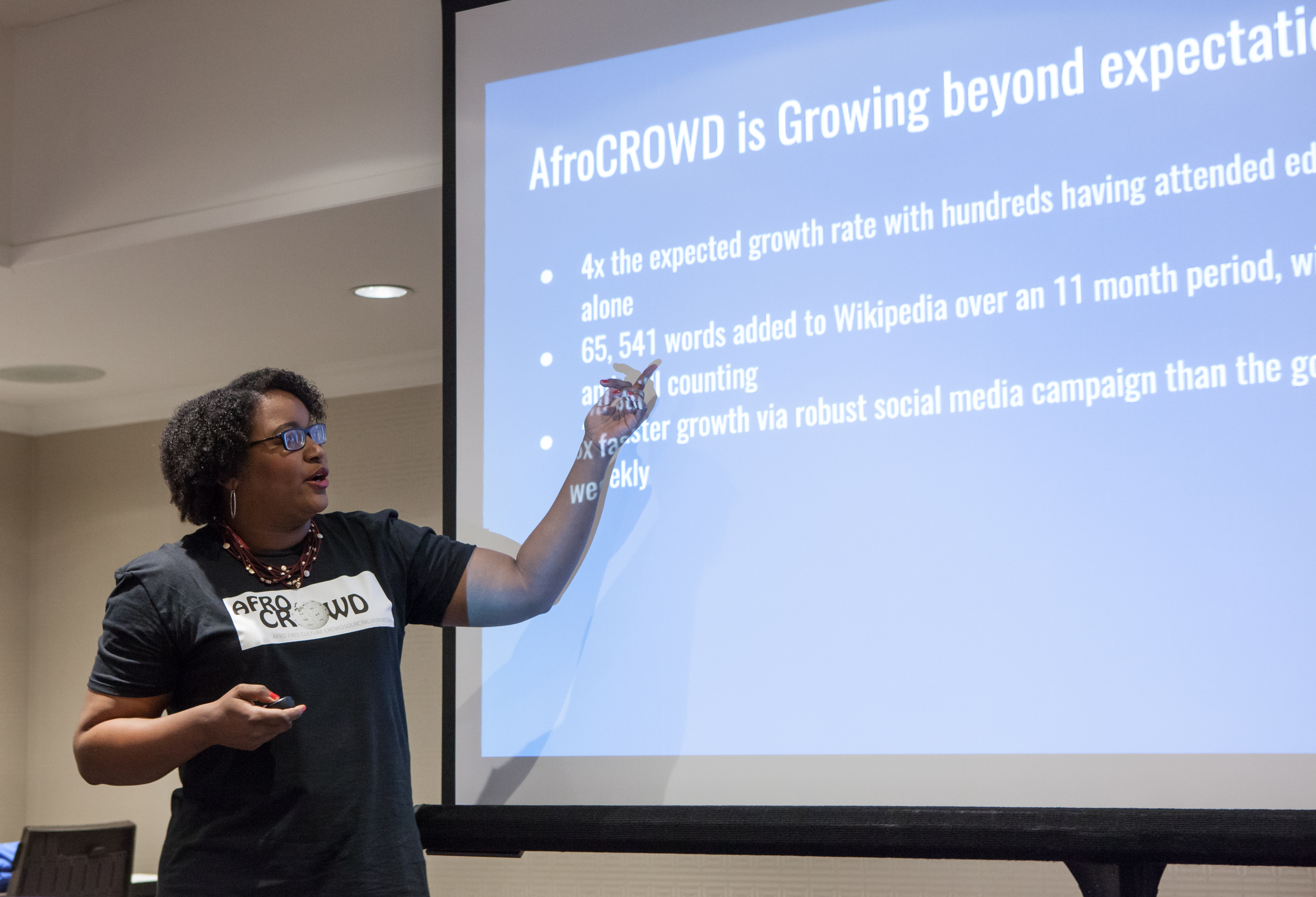
Sherry Antoine of AfroCROWD presents at WikiConference North America, August 2017.

Attempts have been made to rectify racial biases through edit-a-thons, organised events at which Wikipedia editors attempt to improve coverage of certain topics and train new editors. In February 2015, multiple edit-a-thons were organised to commemorate Black History Month in the United States. One such edit-a-thon was organized by the White House to create and improve articles on African Americans in science, technology, engineering and mathematics (STEM). The Schomburg Center, Howard University, and National Public Radio, also coordinated edit-a-thons to improve coverage of black history. "Wikipedia editors … have held 'edit-a-thons,'" to "encourage others to come learn how to ... contribute content on subjects that have been largely ignored." Liriano has endorsed Wikipedia edit-a-thons, stating that for Wikipedia's content to "be representative, everyone has to participate."

In 2015 and 2016, the Schomburg Center held a "Black Lives Matters" edit-a-thon to coincide with Black History Month. Volunteer editors added coverage about Black historical individuals and about key concepts in Black culture (e.g., about the Harlem Book Fair and about Black costume designer Judy Dearing). New articles about Black history and Black historical individuals were also created. The 2016 edit-a-thon was organized by AfroCROWD.

Wikipedia editors Michael Mandiberg and Dorothy Howard have organized diversity-themed edit-a-thons to "help raise awareness of some of the glaring holes on Wikipedia, and the need for people with diverse backgrounds and knowledge to fill them." Liriano stated "It's really important that people of color know that there's this gap" of coverage of Black history on Wikipedia "and they can correct it" by participating as editors. In the US, the National Science Foundation has provided $200,000 to fund research on the issue of bias in the coverage of topics in Wikipedia. The National Science Foundation has commissioned two studies of why there is bias in Wikipedia editing.

The Wikimedia Foundation is trying to deal with the issue of racial bias in Wikipedia. In 2015, it was reported that the Wikimedia Foundation made numerous grants "to organizations in the 'Global South'—including Africa, Latin America, Asia and the Middle East—with plans to improve [coverage of Global South topics in] Wikipedia." While Wikipedia supports these edit-a-thons, the organization has always stressed that adequate citations must always be present and neutrality must always be maintained. Wikipedia co-founder Jimmy Wales has stated that the Wikimedia Foundation has "completely failed" to meet its goals of resolving the lack of diversity amongst Wikipedia editors.

== See also ==
- Criticism of Wikipedia
- Gender bias on Wikipedia
- Geographical bias on Wikipedia
- Systemic bias in Wikipedia
