= Siân Evans (librarian) =

American activist and librarian

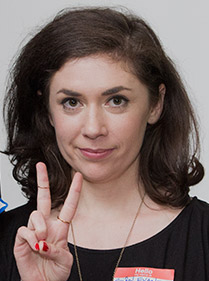
- Evans in 2016
- Occupations: Librarian, activist, and Wikimedian
- Known for: Co-founder of the Art+Feminism, a global edit-a-thon to challenge gender bias on Wikipedia

Siân Evans is an American librarian, activist, and Wikimedian. She is co-founder of the Art+Feminism, a global edit-a-thon to challenge gender bias on Wikipedia. Evans is a librarian at Johns Hopkins University.

== Career ==
Evans is co-founder of Art+Feminism (2014), a global campaign that challenges gender bias on Wikipedia. Evans notes that as part of Art+Feminism, "we do concrete work – adding citations to pages, expanding coverage of women in the arts – but, we also understand these events as platforms for consciousness raising and hopefully strategies for change emerge from that." Evans is the Online Programs Librarian at Sheridan Libraries and Museums at Johns Hopkins University.

In 2014, Evans was named one of Foreign Policy's 100 Leading Global Thinkers.

Evans' research and writing on digitally focused gender equity has been published in Art Documentation: Journal of the Art Libraries Society of North America and in the book Informed Agitation: Library and Information Skills in Social Justice Movements and Beyond. She is part of the Art Libraries Society of North America's Women and Art Special Interest Group.

== See also ==
- List of Wikipedia people
