= Black Lunch Table =

Black artist oral-history archiving project

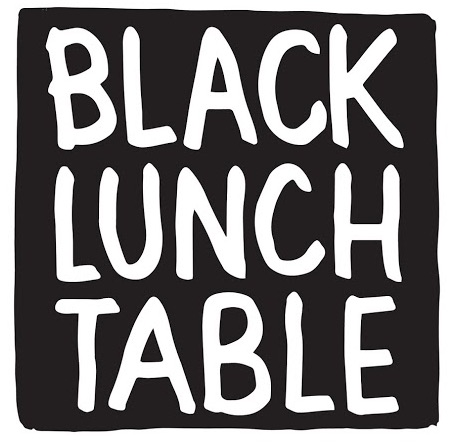
Logo

The Black Lunch Table (BLT) is a United States-based oral-history archiving project founded in 2005, focused on the lives and work of Black artists. Its work includes oral archiving, salons, peer teaching workshops, meetups, and Wikipedia edit-a-thons. The BLT brings people together to engage in dialogues about the writing, recording, and promoting inclusive art history. One of its aims is to address the racial and gender bias on Wikipedia by encouraging Wikipedia articles about African-American artists.

== History ==
Artists Jina Valentine and Heather Hart founded the Black Lunch Table (BLT) in 2005 with an event at the Skowhegan School of Painting and Sculpture artist residency. The BLT has hosted edit-a-thons at a range of institutions and settings including Boston University, Rutgers, The New School, BRIC Arts Media, and others.

BLT gained non-profit status in 2019.

As of 2020, the organization has hosted 72 Wikipedia events in six countries, creating 385 new articles and uploading 727 new images. The organization has received funding from Mellon Foundation, the Warhol Foundation, the Reva & David Logan Foundation, Ruth Foundation for the Arts, Ford Foundation, the Wikimedia Foundation, the Foundation for Contemporary Art, among other sources.
