= WikiConference North America =

Conference by the Wikimedia community

- Logo for WikiConference North America

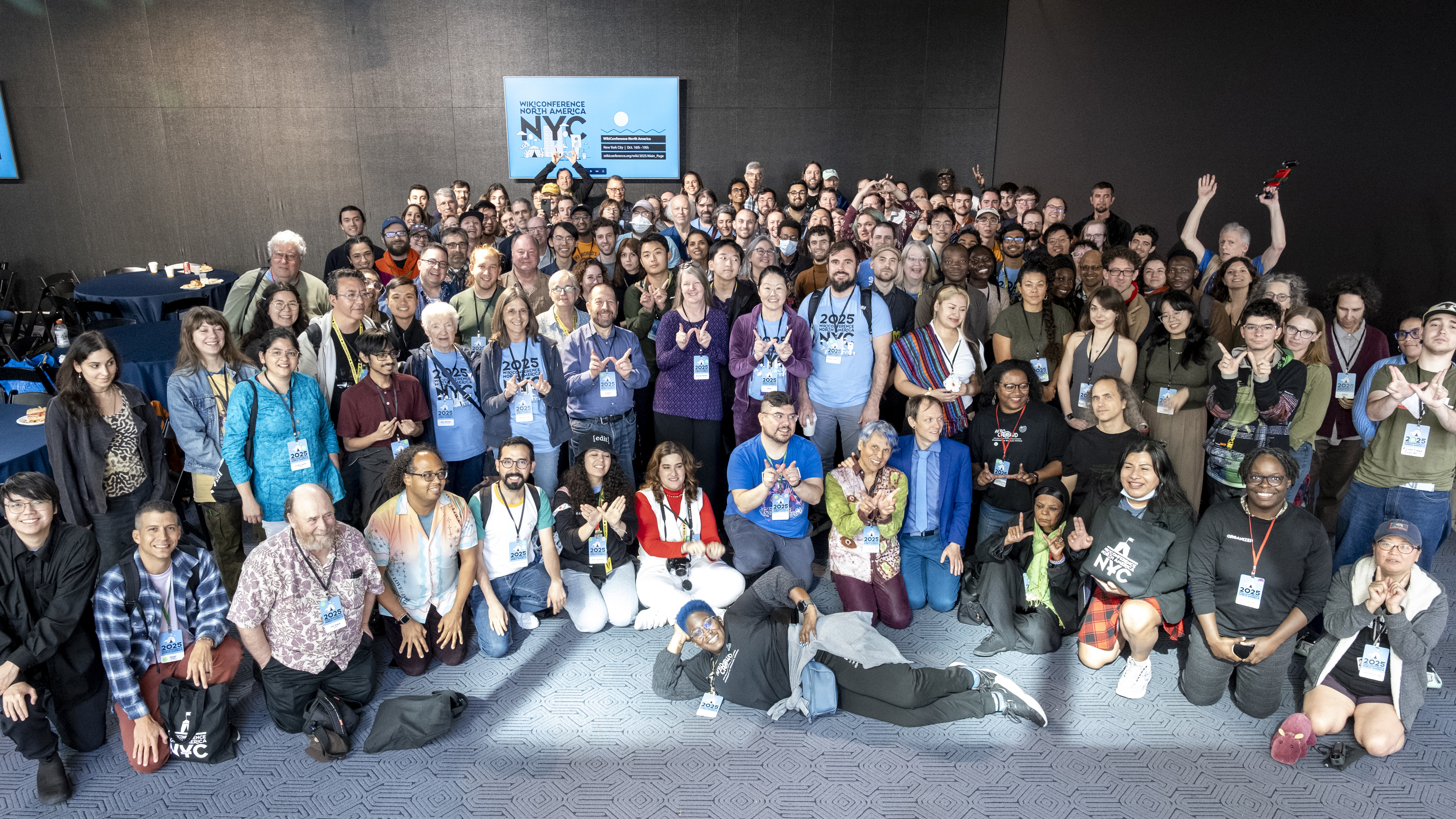
- Event participants in 2025
- Status: Active
- Genre: Conference
- Frequency: Annually
- Years active: 2014–present
- Inaugurated: May 30, 2014
- Most recent: 2026 (Edmonton)
- Next event: 2027 (TBD)
- Website: Official website

WikiConference North America, formerly WikiConference USA, is an annual conference organized by the Wikipedia community in North America. The first two events were held at New York Law School and Washington, D.C.'s National Archives Building in 2014 and 2015, respectively. The third conference, rebranded WikiConference North America, was held at San Diego's Central Library in 2016, with a pre-conference day at Balboa Park.

WikiConference North America 2017 was held in Montreal, as a pre-conference to Wikimania. The 2018 and 2019 events were held in Columbus, Ohio and Cambridge, Massachusetts, respectively. Following virtual conferences from 2020 to 2022 because of the COVID-19 pandemic, the conference returned to an in-person format in Toronto in 2023. The 2024 conference was held at Indiana University Indianapolis. The 2025 conference was held in New York City. The 2026 conference was held in Edmonton, Alberta, Canada.

== Description ==
The annual conference is organized by and for Wikipedia editors, enthusiasts, and volunteers. Staff from the Wiki Education Foundation, which co-sponsored the 2015 event, and the Wikimedia Foundation also attend each year. The conference has been held in New York City; Washington, D.C.; San Diego; Montreal; Columbus, Ohio; Cambridge, Massachusetts; Toronto; and Indianapolis. From 2020 to 2022, events were primarily virtual because of the COVID-19 pandemic.

== History ==
=== WikiConference USA (2014–2015) ===
Logo for the inaugural WikiConference USA 2014

The inaugural WikiConference USA was held during May 30 – June 1, 2014 at New York Law School's Tribeca campus in Lower Manhattan. Established as a national event for the American Wikipedia community, the conference was "devoted to topics concerning the Wikimedia movement in the United States, as well as related topics of free culture and digital rights". It was hosted by Wikimedia Foundation affiliates for the District of Columbia and New York City, with grant funding provided by the foundation and additional support from Consumer Reports, the Institute for Information Law & Policy at New York Law School, and the City University of New York. The program featured two days of keynotes, panels, presentations, and workshops about the state of Wikipedia, addressing issues such as diversity, gender bias, and the socialization of new editors, as well as a one-day unconference. Approximately 250 people attended. According to O'Dwyer's magazine, sessions about conflict-of-interest editing on Wikipedia were "front and center".

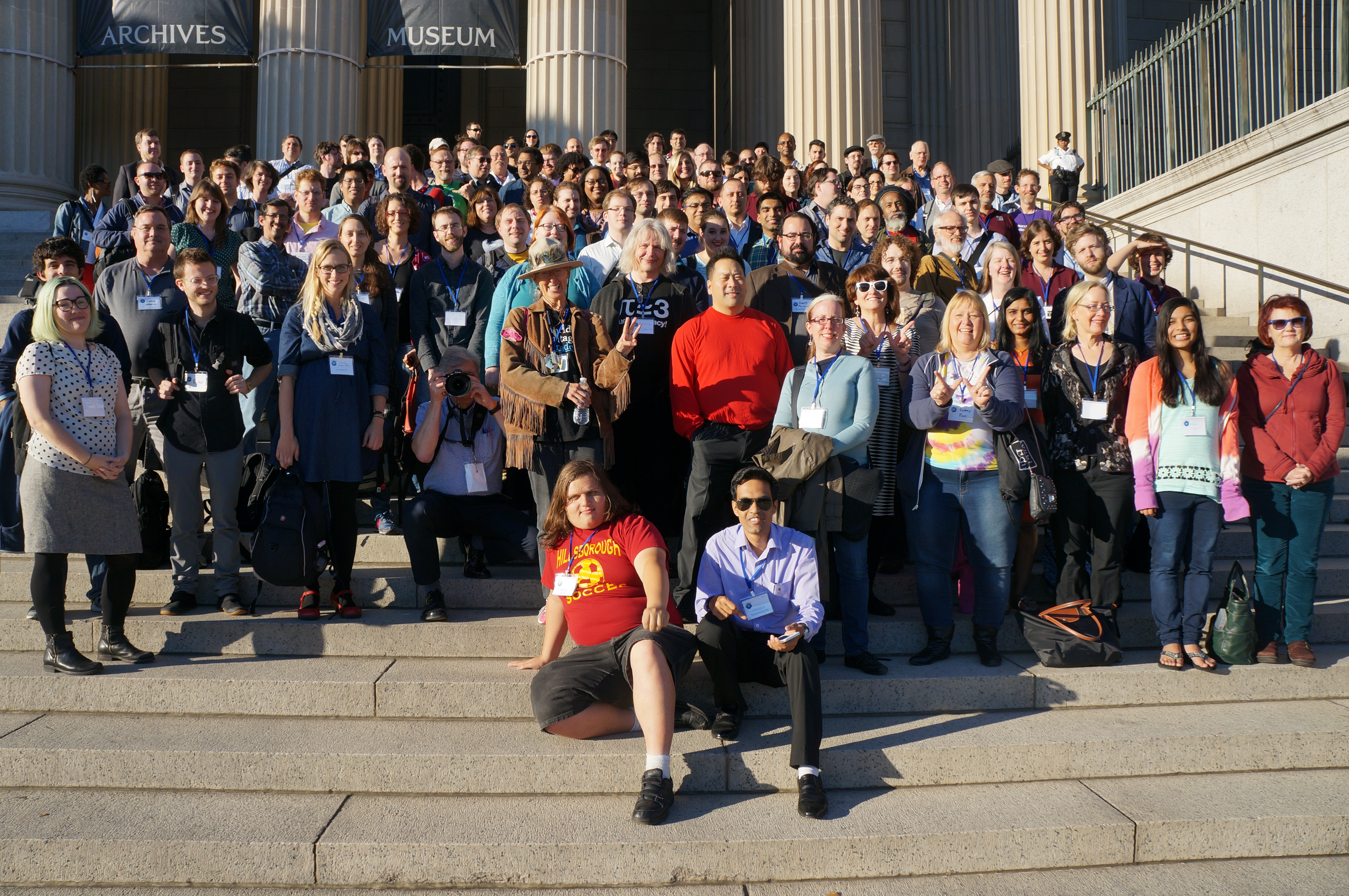
Conference attendees outside the National Archives Building, 2015

The second WikiConference USA was held at the National Archives Building in Washington, D.C., during October 9–11, 2015. The conference was co-sponsored by the National Archives and Records Administration (NARA), which was a sponsor of Wikimania when the event was held in Washington, D.C., in 2012, and the Wiki Education Foundation; Wikimedia Foundation affiliates for the District of Columbia and New York City were also WikiConference partners. Activities included panels, presentations, speeches, and workshops related to Wikipedia's community, collaborations with cultural institutions, role in education, and technology development. Attendees also had access to the National Archives Museum and the Innovation Hub, where records are digitized. The conference featured presentations by Pamela Wright, NARA's chief innovation officer; Andrew Lih; John Howard, who serves as director of the National Institute for Occupational Safety and Health; David Ferriero, Archivist of the United States; Alice Backer of the organization AfroCrowd, which seeks to improve coverage of Africans and African Americans in Wikipedia and other projects; and Danielle Citron, a law professor at the University of Maryland who spoke about hate crimes in cyberspace. Diversity was a central theme throughout the conference, which inspired NARA to host a Wikimedia Diversity Conference in June 2016.

=== WikiConference North America ===
==== 2010s ====
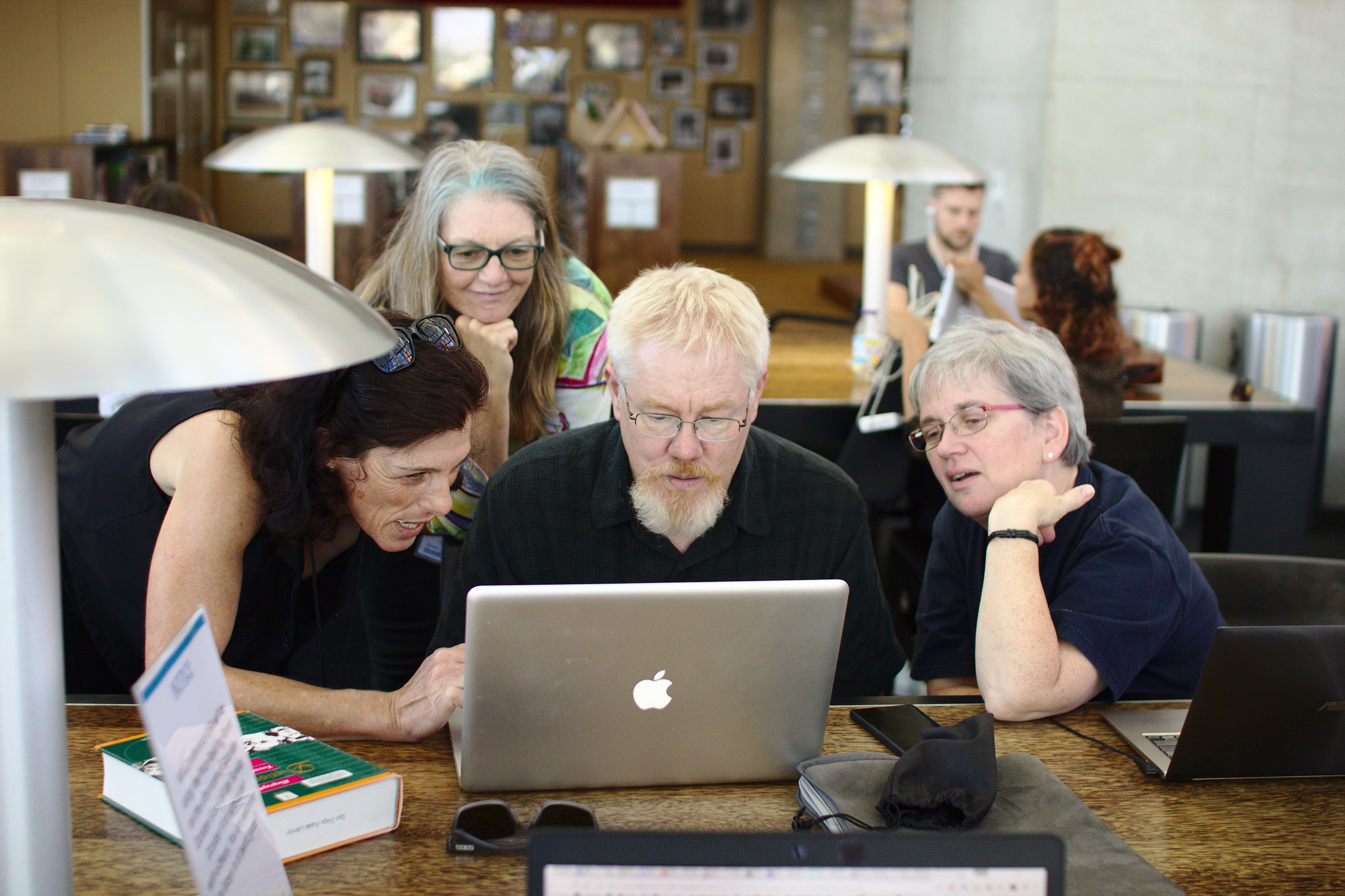
Edit-a-thon participants improving Wikipedia articles about philosophy at the San Diego Central Library in 2016

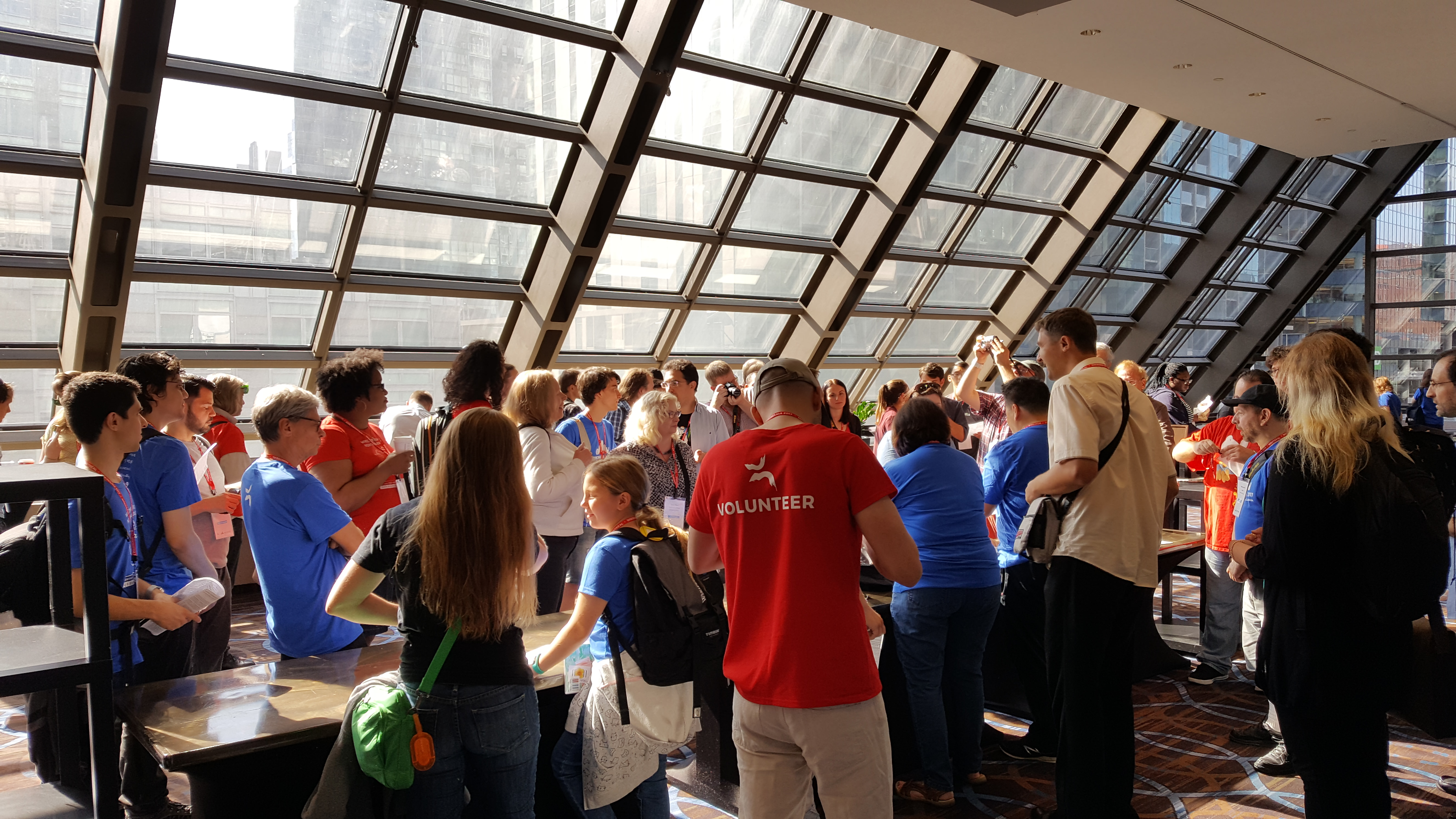
Event participants in Montreal, 2017

The third annual event, renamed to WikiConference North America, was held in San Diego's Central Library during October 7–10, 2016. The conference's scope was increased to include Wikimedians in Canada and Mexico, and the event featured a series of edit-a-thons. Alex Madva, an assistant professor at California State Polytechnic University, Pomona and contributor to the American Philosophical Association's blog, coordinated one on October 8 to improve articles about philosophy and philosophers. The American Chemical Society sponsored another to improve coverage of chemistry and notable chemists. Mike Connolly Miskwish of the Campo Indian Reservation, who also serves as an adjunct faculty member of Native American studies at San Diego State University, facilitated an edit-a-thon in conjunction with Indigenous Peoples' Day to improve Wikipedia articles about indigenous peoples.

Katherine Maher, executive director of the Wikimedia Foundation, facilitated a Wikimedia movement strategy session, and Kelly Doyle, who was hired by West Virginia University Libraries as the first Wikipedian in residence for focusing on gender equality, also presented at the conference. On the day preceding the conference, a "Wiki Culture Crawl" was organized at Balboa Park, allowing editors to visit affiliated museums free of charge for the purpose of improving Wikipedia articles related to local GLAMs and other cultural institutions. Convene, a monthly journal published by the Professional Convention Management Association, said the 2016 event was "organized just the way you might expect that contributors to the world's largest online encyclopedia would approach the task: using the 'wiki' collaborative approach." The journal's Barbara Palmer also noted that Sydney Poore, Rosie Stephenson-Goodknight, and other organizers all lived outside California. On the conference's final day, attendees created the "WikiConference North America User Group" to document best practices for organizing Wikimedia events.

The 2017 event was held at Le Centre Sheraton Hotel in Montreal during August 9–10, as a pre-conference to Wikimania, the official annual conference of the Wikimedia Foundation. In 2018, WikiConference North America was held in Columbus, Ohio, October 18–21, at Ohio State University's Thompson Memorial Library and other campus locations. The 2019 event was held at the Massachusetts Institute of Technology in Cambridge, mainly in the Ray and Maria Stata Center, during November 8–11.

==== 2020s ====
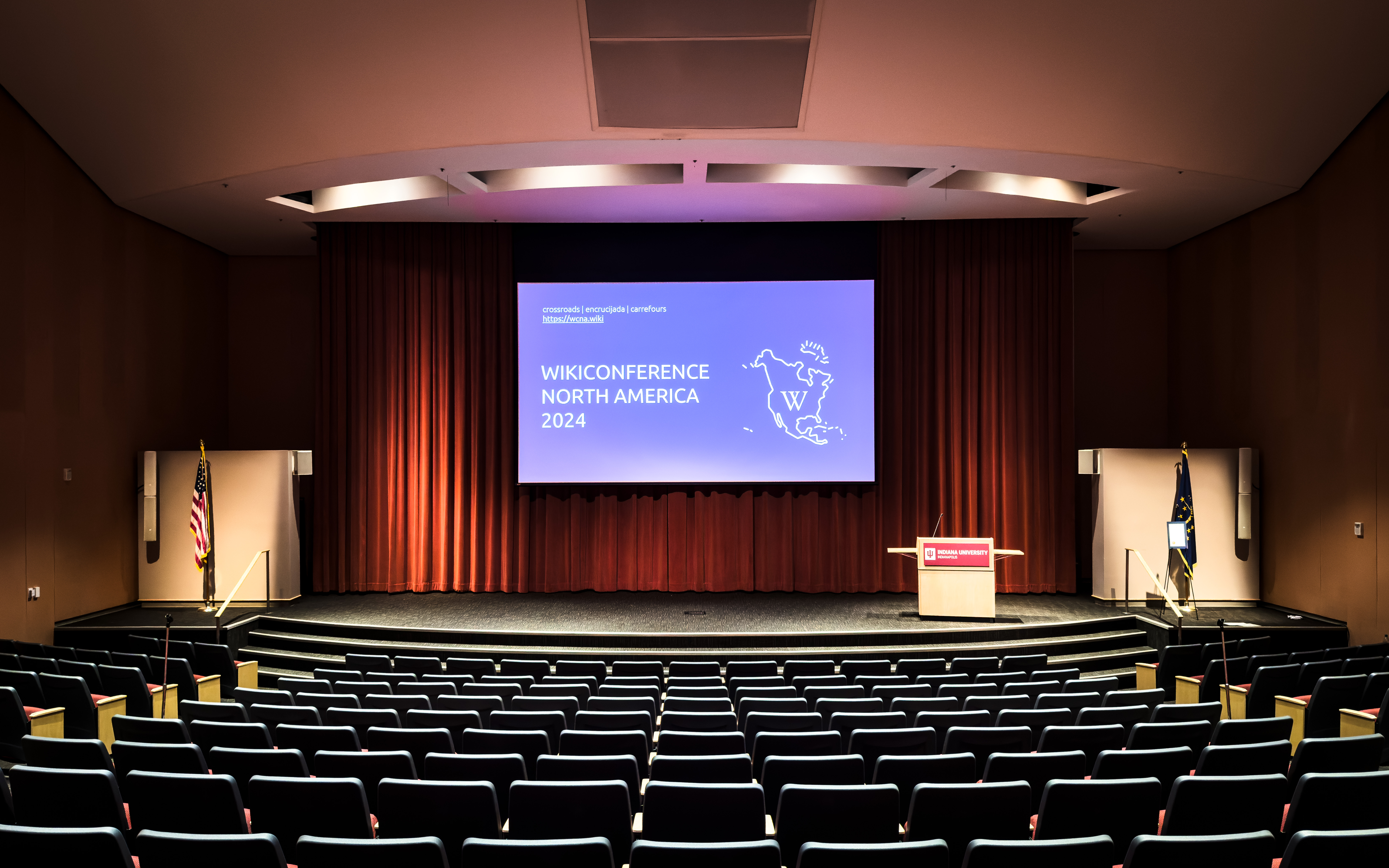
Indiana University Indianapolis's Hine Hall during the 2024 conference

WikiConference North America was virtual from 2020 to 2022 because of the COVID-19 pandemic. The 2020 event was held during December 11–13. The 2021 event was held during October 8–10 and saw a Wiknic in New York City. The 2022 event was held in November with Mapping USA in collaboration with OpenStreetMap.

WikiConference North America returned to an in-person format in 2023 with the theme "Recent Changes". It was held at the Toronto Reference Library in Toronto, Ontario, from November 9–12. The 2024 conference was held at Indiana University Indianapolis. The theme was "Crossroads", inspired by the Indiana state motto and also alluding to the multiple meanings of the word—as the place where Wikimedians from across the continent cross paths. The first day of the conference—October 4—was declared as "Wikipedia Day" in Indianapolis through a proclamation by mayor Joe Hogsett.

The 2025 conference was held in New York City, under the theme of a "Wiki World's Fair" to celebrate the city's 400th anniversary. On the first day of the conference, a self-declared "anti-contact non-offending pedophile" rushed the stage wielding a gun and threatened to kill himself. Two conference participants, Richard Knipel and Andrew Lih, immediately restrained him, and no shots were fired.

In January 2026, Wikimedia Canada announced that the 2026 conference would take place in Edmonton, Alberta, Canada, on September 25–27, 2026, with a Culture Crawl happening the day before on September 24.

== See also ==
- WikiConference India
- Wiki Indaba
