= Richard Knipel =

Wikipedian

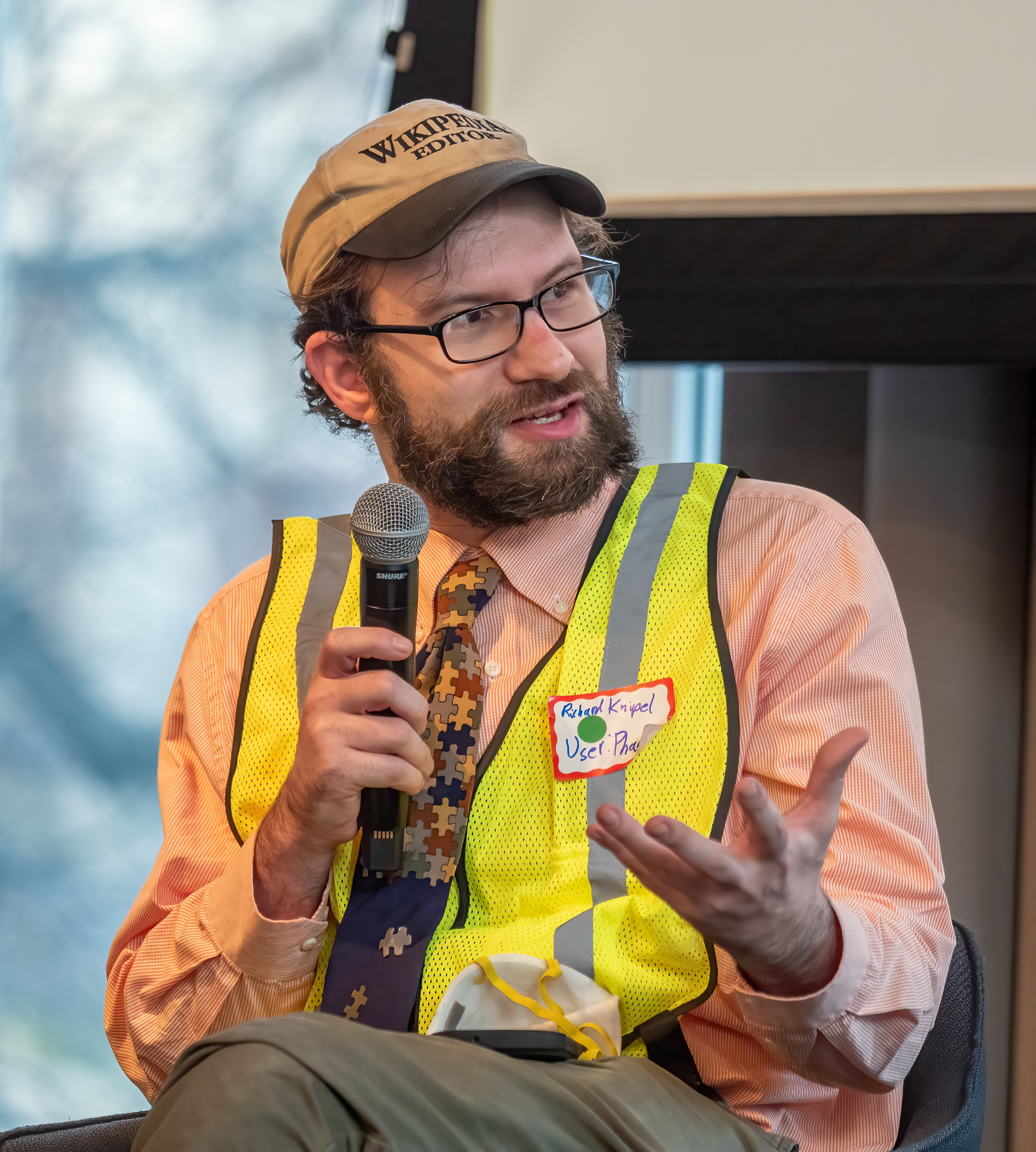
- Knipel at Wikipedia Day NYC 2024

Richard Knipel (also known as Pharos) is a Wikipedian best known for his involvement in Wikimedia New York City. Knipel has been Wikimedian-in-residence at New York's Museum of Modern Art, the Guggenheim, the Metropolitan Museum of Art, and the City University of New York.

He is best known for his actions in 2025, when he and fellow Wikipedian Andrew Lih "averted tragedy" by restraining a gunman during WikiConference North America.

== Biography ==
Circa 2015, Knipel was a chapter representative of Wikimedia New York City when he was recruited to assist with the Art+Feminism Wikipedia edit-a-thon.

In 2022, Knipel created the article Artwork title, whose first revision was a draft generated by ChatGPT which Knipel later edited to conform to Wikipedia standards. Knipel stated on a talk page that he believed this was the first time anyone had used ChatGPT to compose a Wikipedia article. The posting of this article was criticized and shamed by other editors and sparked controversy within the Wikipedia community, leading to an extensive debate about whether large language models should be used in writing content for Wikipedia. When interviewed the following year by Slate, Knipel stated that he believed LLMs were a "literary tool" against writer's block, and that the LLM tended to both generalize and exhibit too much confidence, needing to be extensively edited to tone it down to neutrality.

In August 2025, the City University of New York announced that Richard Knipel would be their first Wikimedian-In-Residence, funded by Craig Newmark Philanthropies. Knipel was tasked with publicizing research papers, archived materials, and studies from CUNY, as well as showing students and professors how to upload their research to Wikipedia so their research becomes widely available.

In 2025, Knipel and Andrew Lih restrained a shooter that stormed the stage of New York's WikiConference North America, who intended to commit suicide publicly. The New York Times and other news outlets reported positively on Knipel and Lih's quick response, and the articles mention that other Wikipedians had awarded him barnstars to commend his courageous action.

As of June 2026, he was a member of the Wiki Education Foundation.

== Gallery ==
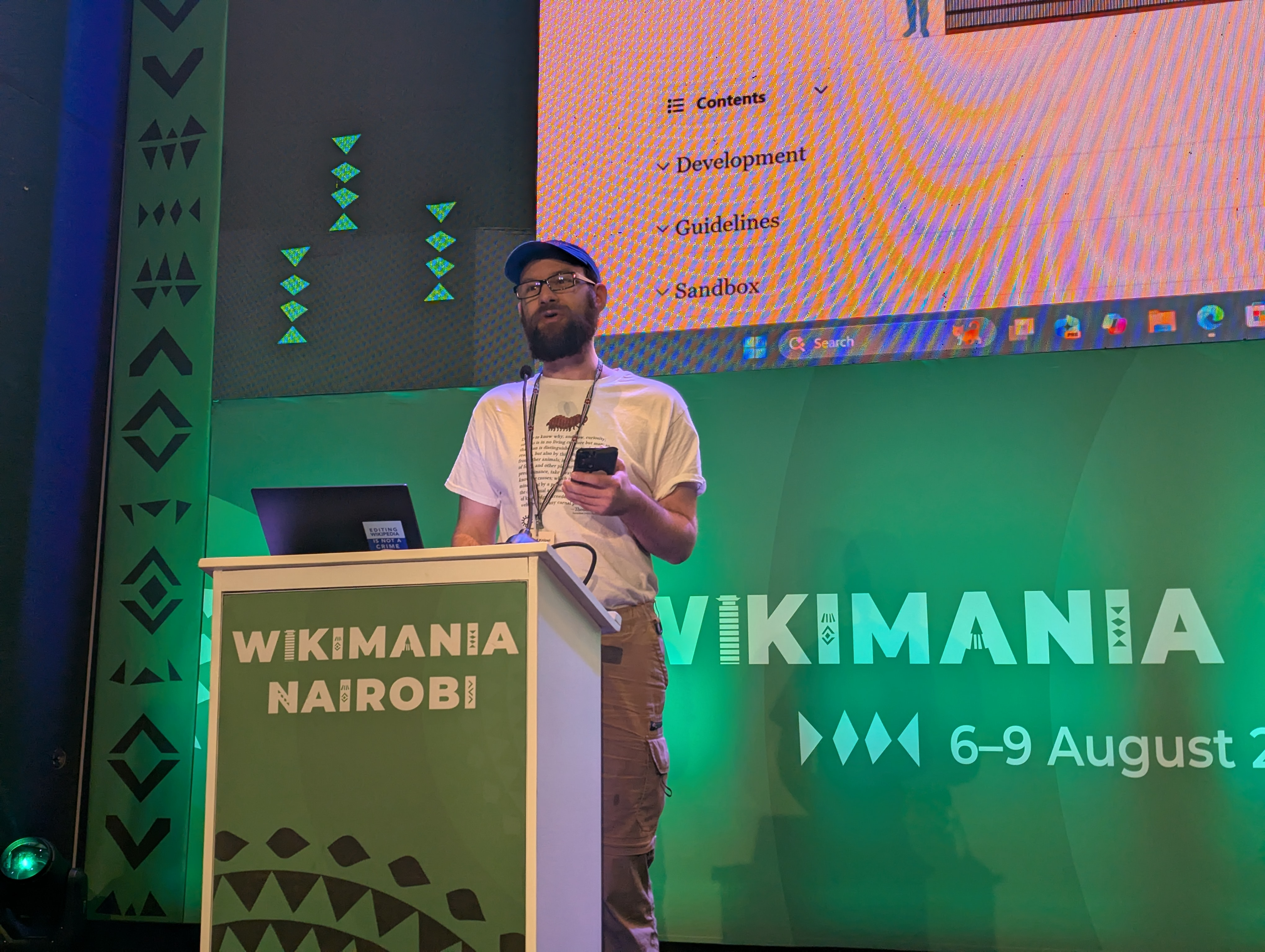
Knipel giving a talk during Wikimania in Nairobi, 2025.

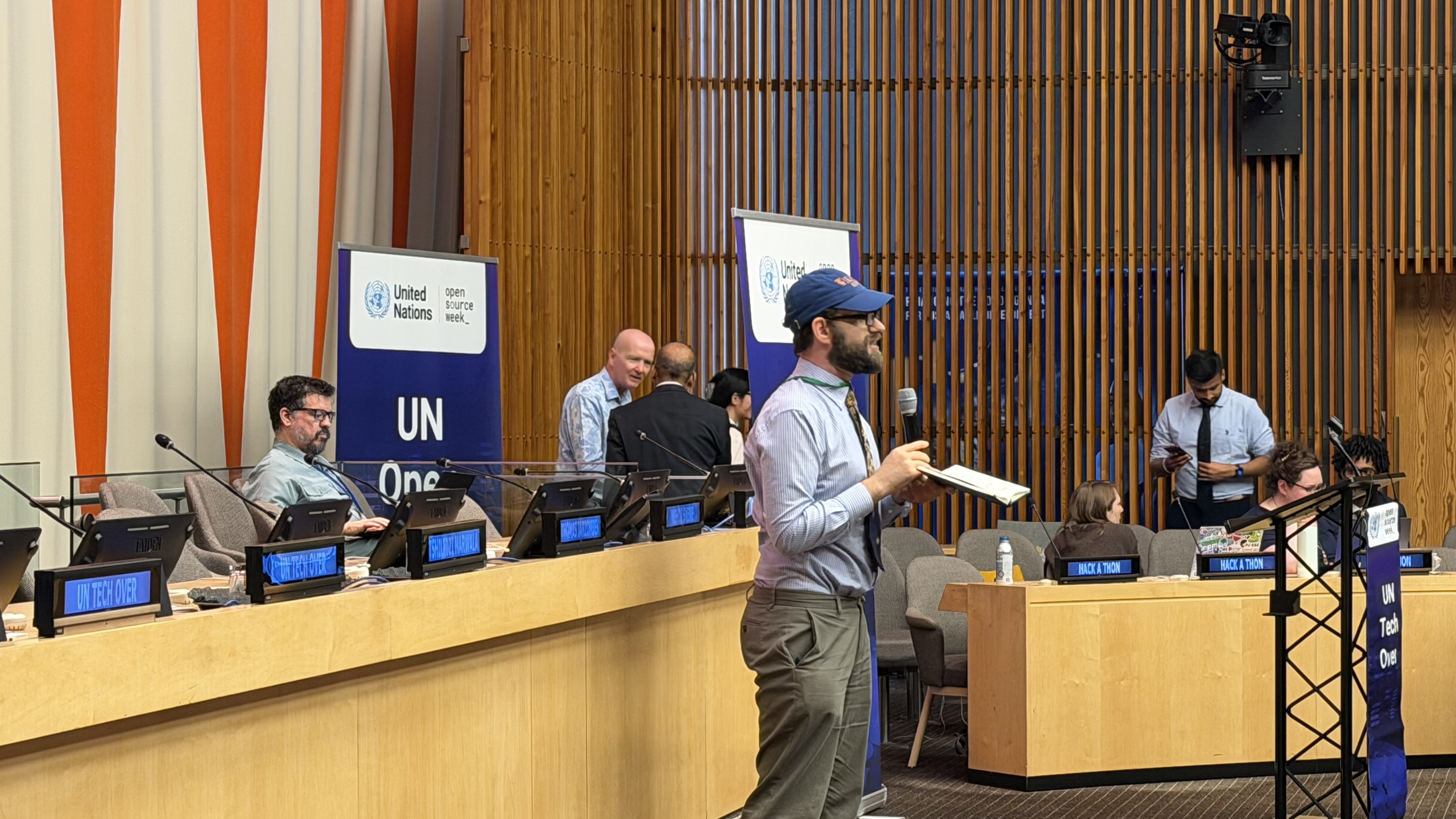
Knipel speaking at UN Edit-a-thon, 2026

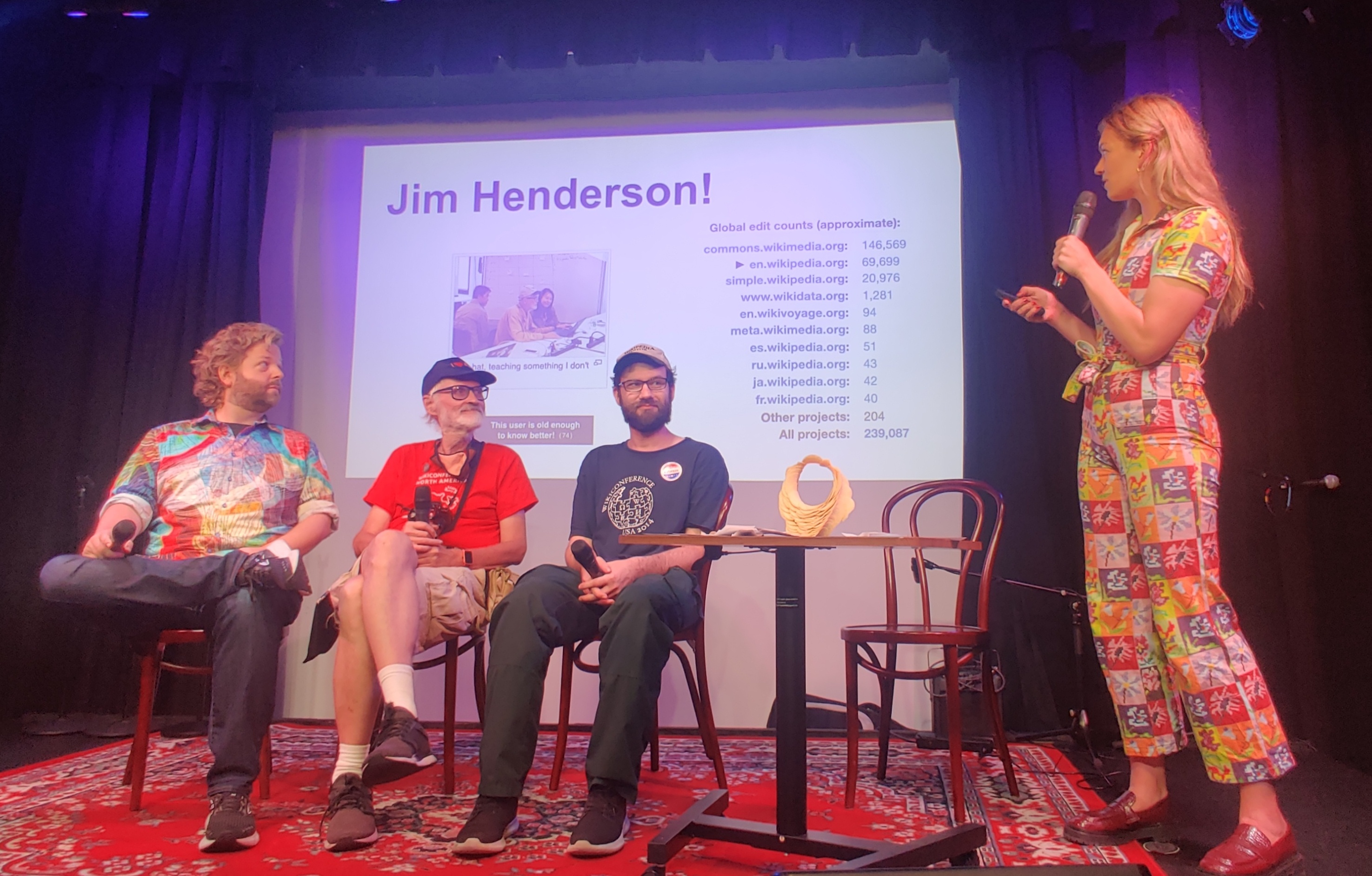
Ryan McGrady, Jim Henderson and Richard Knipel at the Depths of Wikipedia live event with Annie Rauwerda at the Caveat in New York City, 2022

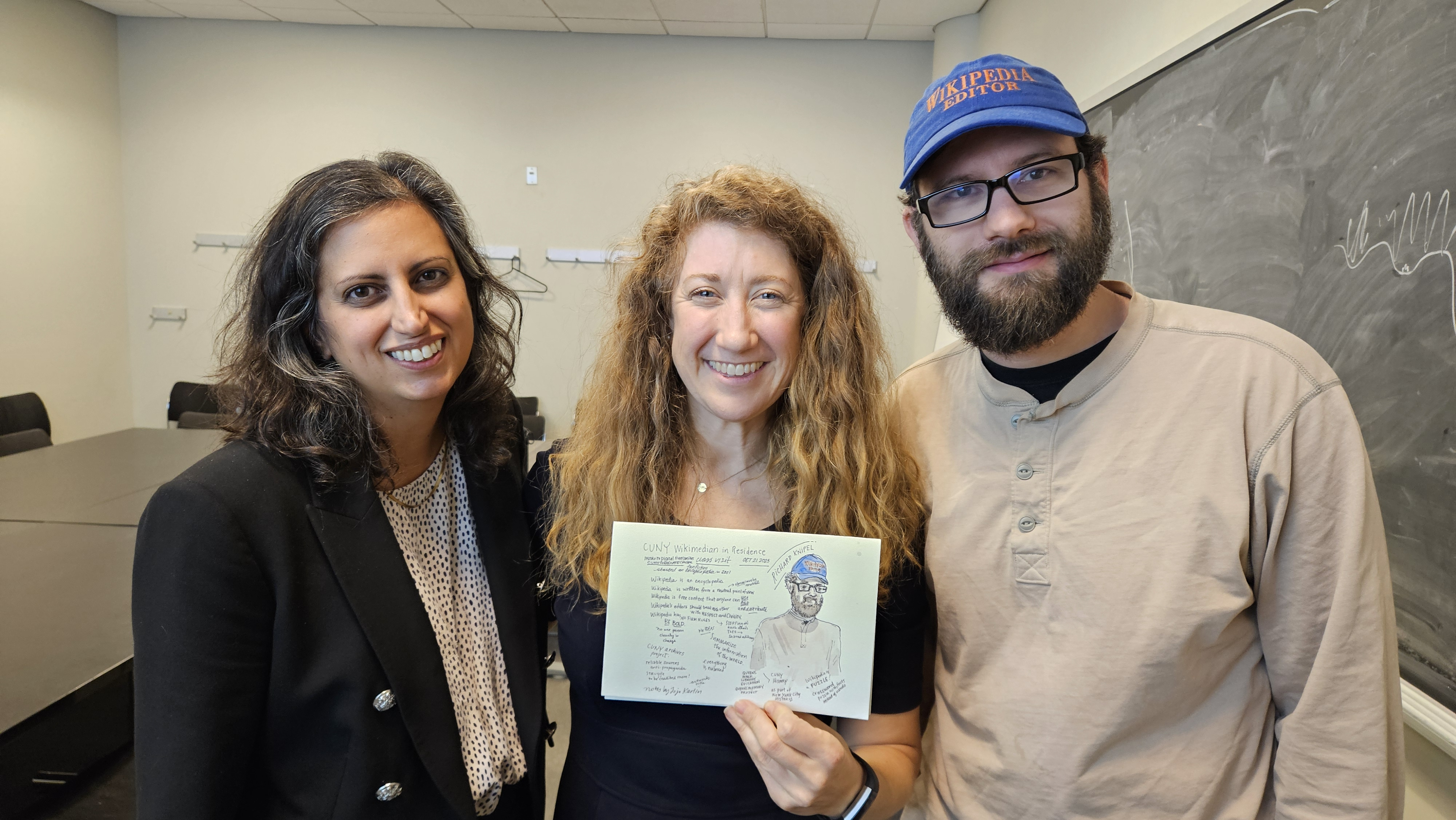
CUNY Newmark Wikimedian-in-Residence Richard Knipel (right) joined Drs. Krystyna Michael (left) & Jojo Karlin (center) at the CUNY Graduate Center, October 2025

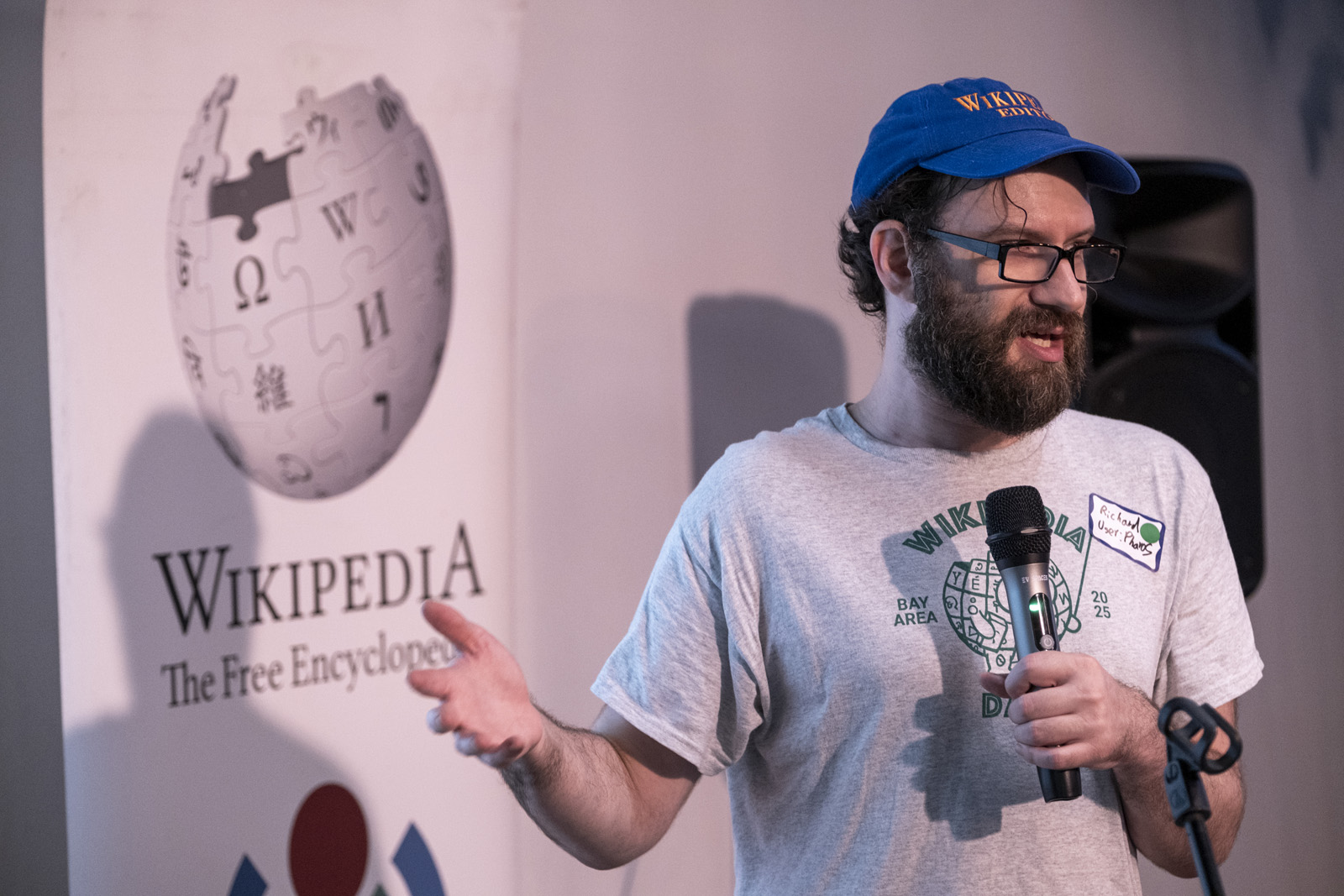
Knipel at the 2025 Wikimedia NYC and Women Do News edit-a-thon

== See also ==
- Artificial intelligence in Wikimedia projects
- List of Wikipedia people
