= AfroCrowd =

Initiative that seeks to improve Wikipedia's coverage of black history and culture

- Logo
- Formation: 2015; 11 years ago
- Founder: Alice Backer
- Website: afrocrowd.org

AfroCROWD (Afro Free Culture Crowdsourcing Wikimedia), is an initiative founded in 2015 by Alice Backer in New York City. Its mission is to increase awareness and participation of people of African descent in the Wikimedia and free knowledge, culture, and software movements. The organisation addresses the underrepresentation of Black history and culture on Wikipedia and other Wikimedia projects by organising edit-a-thons, workshops, and partnerships with cultural and educational institutions.

== Description ==
AfroCROWD Manager Sherry Antoine talked with German Wikipedia editor Sebastian Wallroth at WikiConference North America 2018 in Columbus, Ohio for podcast WikiJabber

AfroCROWD seeks to increase the number of people of African descent who actively take part in the Wikimedia and open knowledge movements. In the 2010s, as Wikipedia grew, researchers observed a noted dearth in content pertaining to sub-Saharan African history on Wikipedia.

In 2015, Daniella Bien-Aime of The Haitian Times called AfroCrowd "a multilingual initiative to increase Afrodescendant participation in crowdsourcing initiatives such as Wikipedia". Described as a "do-it-yourself initiative", AfroCROWD hosts edit-a-thons and talks across the New York metropolitan area. The group has partnered with the Brooklyn Public Library and other organizations such as the Haiti Cultural Exchange and Haitian Creole Language Institute to host Wikipedia-focused events.

== History and mission ==
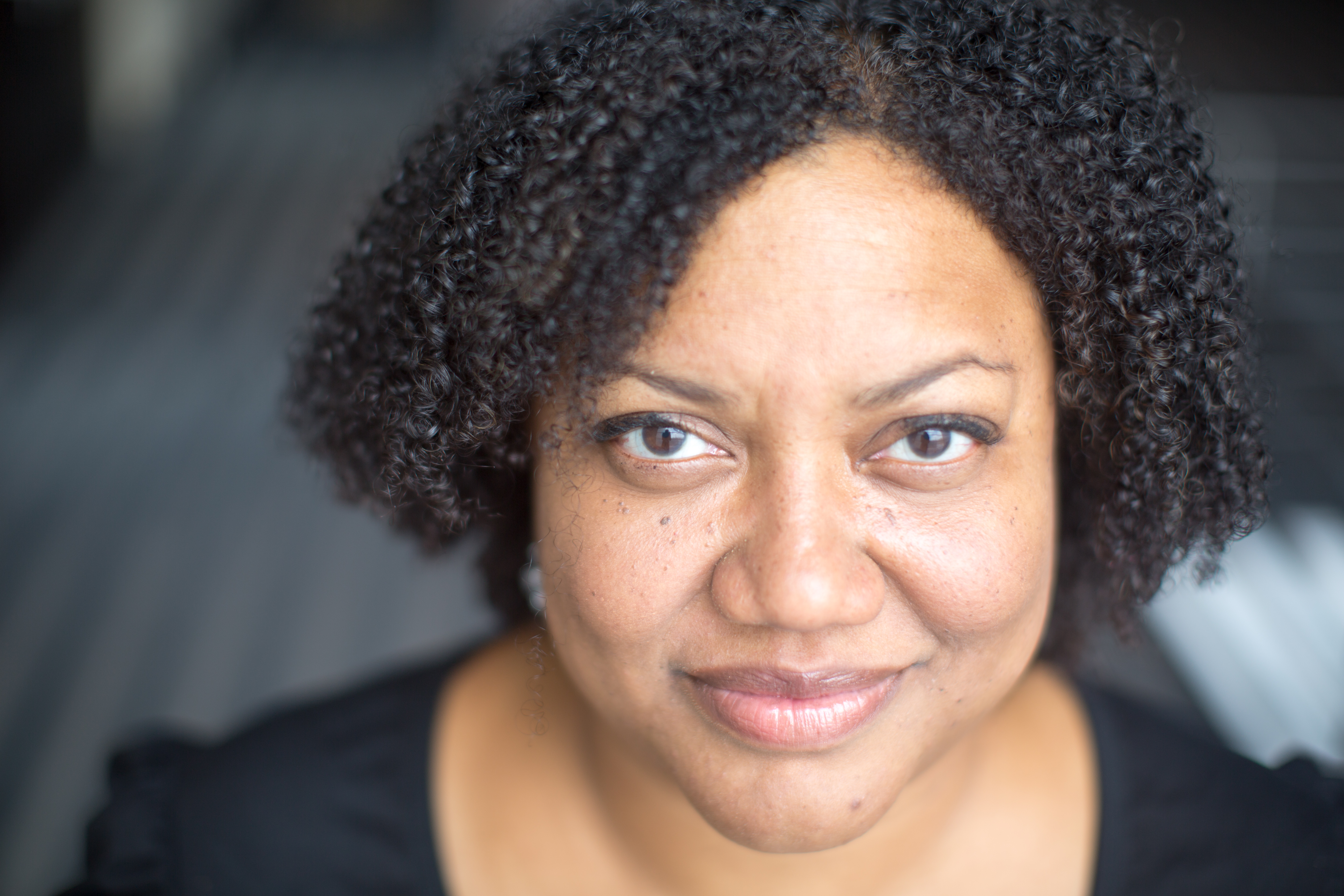
Alice Backer in 2015

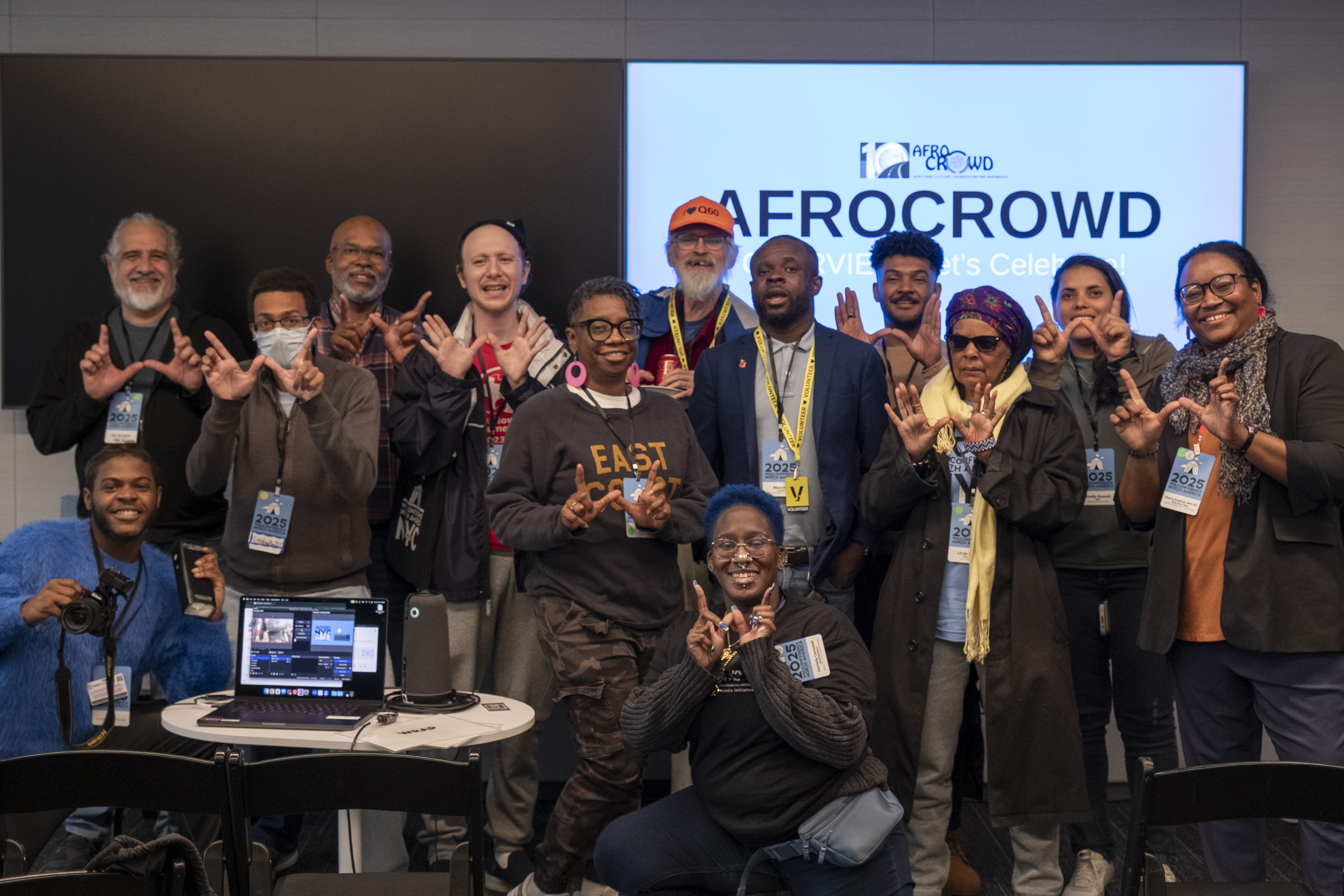
AfroCROWD at WikiConference North America, NYC, 2025

Alice Backer, a Haitian-American attorney and digital activist launched AfroCROWD in February 2015. Backer aimed to create a platform that would empower Black communities to contribute to the digital knowledge space. AfroCROWD's mission aligns with broader efforts to confront systemic bias in digital knowledge platforms and to promote inclusivity in information sharing.

Daniella Bien-Aime included Backer in The Haitian Times' 2015 list of 10 "Haitian social media influencers you should follow". In 2020, leading up to Juneteenth, AfroCrowd hosted efforts to improve Wikipedia articles related to civil rights. The group has received funding from the Wikimedia Foundation.

=== Activities ===
AfroCROWD conducts regular edit-a-thons and training sessions, mainly in collaboration with libraries, museums, and academic institutions. These events are designed to teach participants how to edit Wikipedia. They try and encourage creation and improvement of articles related to African and African diaspora histories and cultures. Notable collaborations include partnerships with the Schomburg Center for Research in Black Culture and the Brooklyn Public Library.

AfroCROWD has also participated in international Wikimedia campaigns aimed at increasing the representation of marginalized communities. It has been involved in initiatives such as #VisibleWikiWomen and frequently collaborates with user groups like Art+Feminism, Whose Knowledge?, and the Black Lunch Table to advocate for greater diversity on the platform.

=== Impact ===
AfroCROWD has played a significant role in addressing the content and contributor gaps on Wikipedia. By focusing on the inclusion of Black voices and histories, the initiative challenges the systemic biases that have historically marginalised these narratives in digital spaces. Scholars have recognised AfroCROWD's contributions to diversifying Wikipedia's content and community, highlighting its role in fostering a more equitable information ecosystem.

=== Recognition ===
The work of AfroCROWD has been acknowledged in academic literature as a model for community engagement and digital activism. Researchers have examined the organization's strategies for promoting inclusivity and have emphasized the importance of such initiatives in reshaping the digital knowledge landscape. AfroCROWD's efforts have been featured in discussions on the role of libraries and archives in supporting marginalised communities' participation in knowledge creation.

== See also ==
- Afripedia Project
- Black Lunch Table
- Wikimedia New York City
