= Foundation for Contemporary Art =

The Foundation for Contemporary Art (FCA) is a Ghanaian visual arts foundation that aims to create an active network of artists and provide a critical forum for the development of contemporary art in Ghana. Based on the name idea and respective function suggestion of photographer Eric Don-Arthur to Virginia Ryan in Accra, Ghana - the FCA was founded in 2004 by Professor Joe Nkrumah and Australian/Italian artist Virginia Ryan, along with Eric Don-Arthur and 12 other founding members. The FCA office is located in the W.E.B. DuBois Memorial Centre for Pan-African Culture in the Cantonments neighborhood of Accra.

== Membership ==
The Foundation for Contemporary Art currently has circa 100 members — artists, critics, collectors, art enthusiasts — as well as an advisory board and an executive board. The Foundation for Contemporary Art Ghana actively recruits new members and welcomes all practising artists and people interested in contemporary arts.

== Objectives ==
The objectives of the Foundation for Contemporary Art are fourfold:

1. Organize exhibitions, seminars, workshops and publications to raise the awareness of and develop critical thinking about contemporary art in Ghana
2. Establish a resource centre of arts-related texts available for consultation, research and documentation
3. Create a website to promote contemporary art in Ghana
4. Establish a public database of artists, arts organizations, art businesses, galleries and others interested in contemporary art in Ghana
