= Art+Feminism =

Annual worldwide Wikipedia edit-a-thon

- Status: Active
- Frequency: Annually
- Location: 70 venues in 17 countries (2015)
- Years active: 12
- Inaugurated: February 1, 2014
- Most recent: 2025
- Attendance: 1,300 (2015)
- Organizer: Siân Evans; Jacqueline Mabey; Michael Mandiberg; Laurel Ptak
- Website: artandfeminism.org

Art and Feminism (stylized as Art+Feminism) is a registered 501(c)(3) organization started in 2014 as an annual worldwide edit-a-thon to add content to Wikipedia about women artists. The project has been described as "a massive multinational effort to correct a persistent bias in Wikipedia, which is disproportionately written by and about men".

In 2014, Art+Feminism's inaugural campaign attracted 600 volunteers at 30 events. The following year, a total of 1,300 volunteers attended 70 events that took place across 17 countries, on four continents. Since then more than 20,000 people have taken part in over 1,500 events. This has led to the creation or improvement of over 100,000 Wikipedia articles. In January 2025, Art+Feminism announced its 2025–2026 campaign, centered on imagining what a "truly feminist internet" could look like. The success of Art+Feminism comes from the collective efforts of individuals from various backgrounds such as scholars, Wikipedians, and librarians. These individuals play major roles in pushing their efforts, as society's further growing interest in gender equality within the technological sector. The importance of addressing issues relating closely to gender also aligns closely with the goals of Art+Feminism.

== Establishment ==
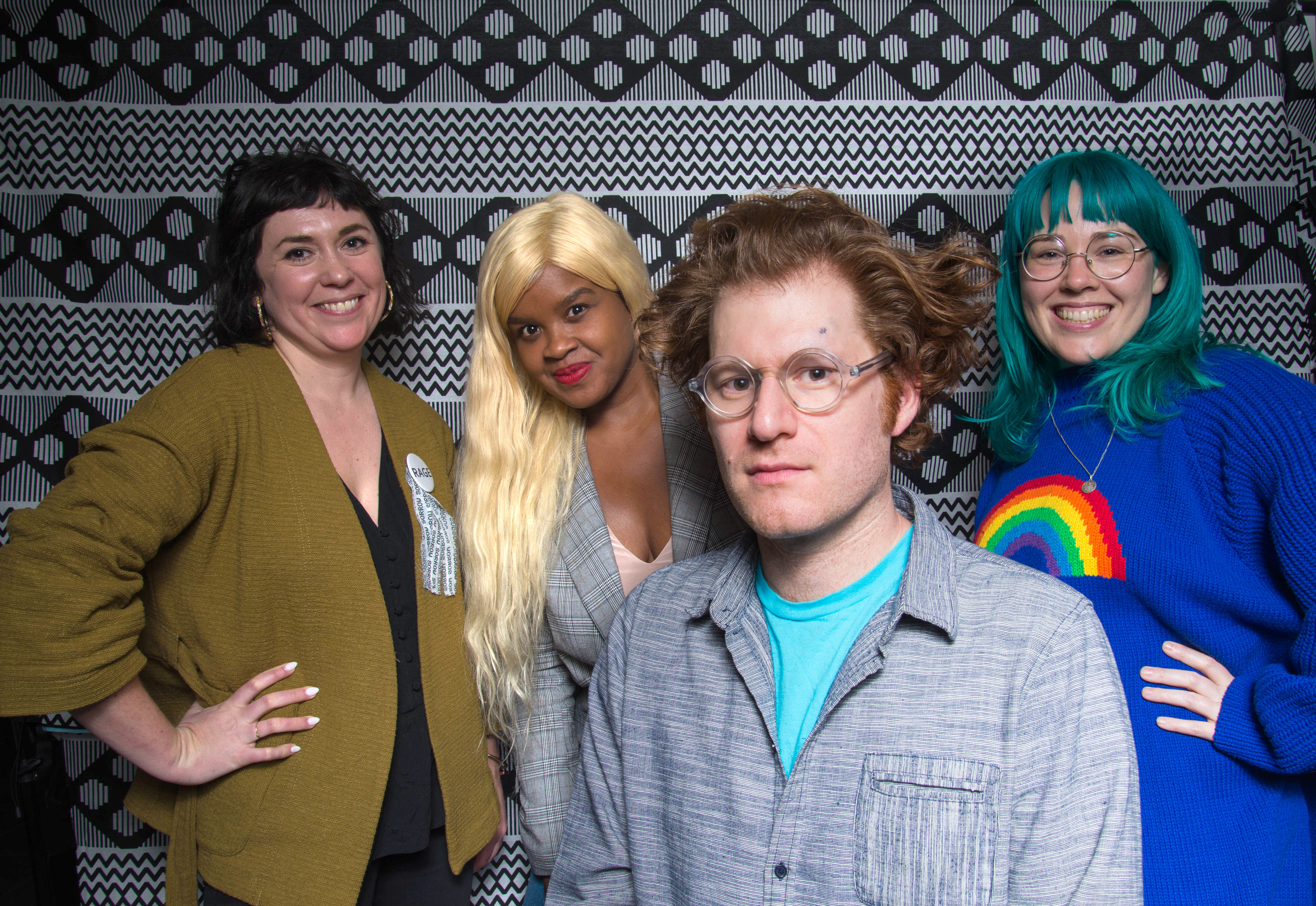
Siân Evans, McKensie Mack, Michael Mandiberg, and Jacqueline Mabey (left to right)

Art+Feminism started when Artstor librarian Siân Evans was designing a project for women and art for the Art Libraries Society of North America. Evans talked with fellow curator Jacqueline Mabey, who had been impressed by Wikipedia contributors' organization of edit-a-thon events to commemorate Ada Lovelace. Mabey spoke with Michael Mandiberg, a professor at the City University of New York who had been incorporating Wikipedia into classroom learning. Mandiberg in turn talked with Laurel Ptak, a fellow at the art and technology non-profit Eyebeam, who agreed to help plan the event. The team then recruited local Wikipedians Dorothy Howard, then Wikipedian in residence at Metropolitan New York Library Council; and Richard Knipel, then representing the local chapter of Wikipedia contributors through Wikimedia New York City.

One reason for establishing the Art+Feminism project included responding to negative media coverage about Wikipedia's gender and racial biases. The project continues to fill content gaps in Wikipedia and increase the number of female contributors. Only about 17 percent of biographies on Wikipedia are about women and only about 15 percent of Wikipedia editors are female. Efforts are being made to advocate and better the representation of not only cisgender women but there is also a push to include the voices of transgender and non-binary identifying individuals. There is also an emphasis to specifically fill content gaps on topics on the arts and feminism. Kira Wisniewski was appointed Art+Feminism's executive director in 2020.

== Events ==
Video from an Art+Feminism edit-a-thon at the Museum of Modern Art, 2015

Outside the United States, the 2015 event received media coverage at locations including Australia, Canada, Cambodia, India, New Zealand, and Scotland. Events continuously grow and take place in countries in various continents all over the world. Inside the United States, the event received media coverage at the flagship location in New York, and also in California, Kansas, Pennsylvania, Texas, and West Virginia.

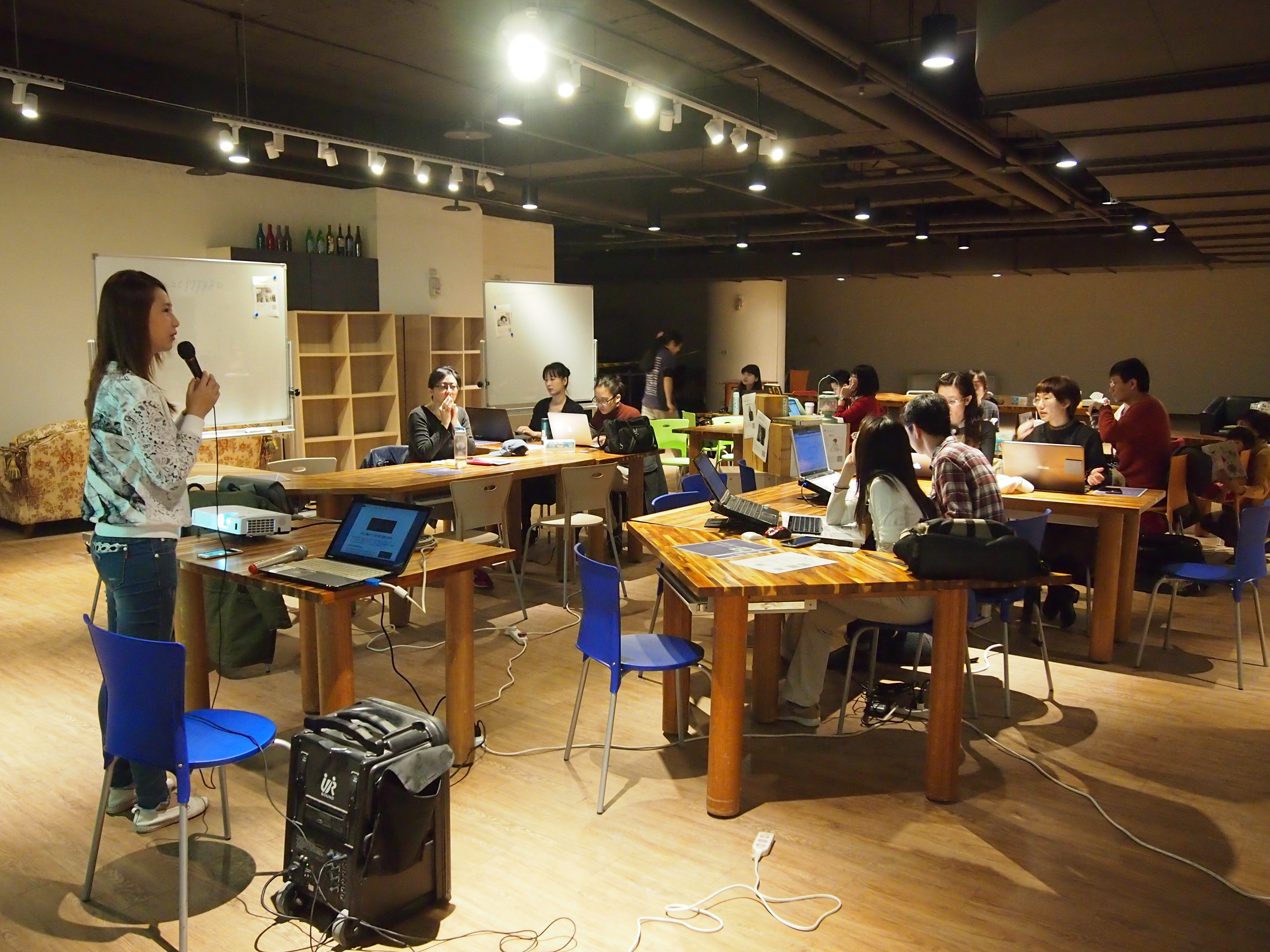
"Art+Feminism edit-a-thon Taiwan 2017" by Wikimedia Taiwan

Annually, many academic institutions in the United States hold Art+Feminism edit-a-thon events, pushing to encourage more women to edit on Wikipedia. These edit-a-thon events take place as collective workshops where students are encouraged to meet up together to edit in a collective space, whether in person or through virtual chatrooms. Some of these institutions that participate in the Art+Feminism movement include Southern Methodist University, Ohio University, Yale University University of Nevada, and Cornell University.

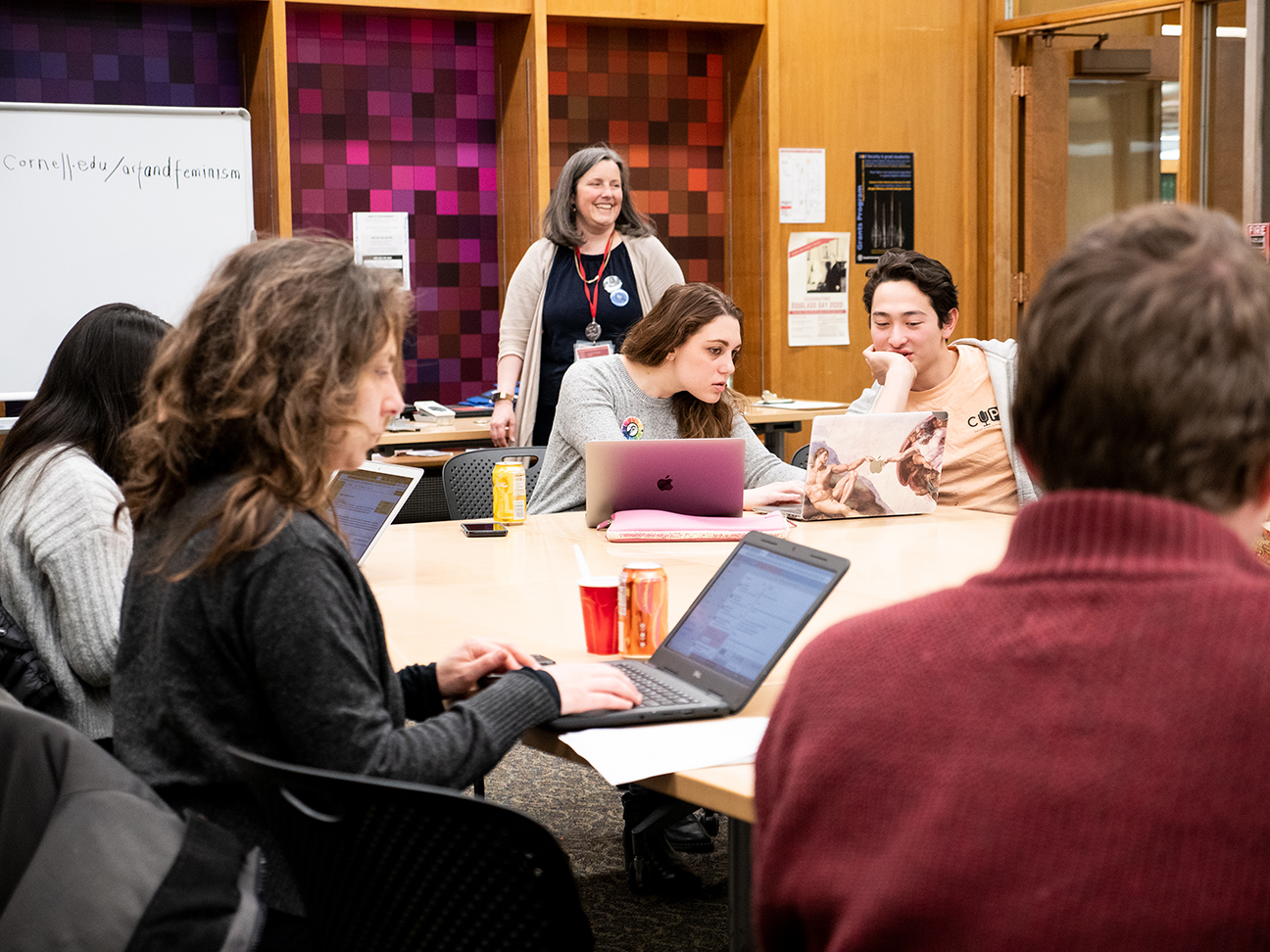
"Editing Wikipedia for Cornell University's Art+Feminism edit-a-thon March 6, 2020" by Unionpearl

Various forms of events are open to being held by anybody, which can include edit-a-thons, panels/conversations, and meet ups. These organized events can be held in virtual or in-person formats to encourage accessibility of engagement. Each event has its regulated guidelines stated by the organization. Events typically concentrate annually in March, which is Women's History Month, but their campaign lasts year-round.

In 2020, due to concerns from the COVID-19 pandemic, the event was held virtually, via the Zoom video conferencing app. In 2021, the Art+Feminism campaign was again made virtual due to COVID-19 concerns.

Although the project is global, director Kira Wisniewski lives in Baltimore and personally organizes events and collaborations with cultural organizations in that area.

Content contributed by participants in the editing events is tracked in a coordinating forum on Wikipedia.

== Reception ==
In November 2014, Foreign Policy magazine named Evans, Mabey, Mandiberg, Knipel, Howard, and Ptak as "global thinkers" for addressing gender bias on Wikipedia.

In March 2017, Abigail Cain wrote on Artsy and spoke about how this impactful and powerful initiative helps to incentivize women to come together to become editors and improve articles. Cain also notes how Art+Feminism has globally grown as a whole and that Art+Feminism events are being organized by large museums and art organizations.

== See also ==
- Feminist art criticism
- Women in Red
- Women's empowerment
- Wikimedia New York City
