= Wiki Education Foundation =

Nonprofit organization

- Location(s): Chico, California, United States
- Key people: Executive Director: Frank Schulenburg; Chair, Board of Directors: PJ Tabit
- Employees: 14 (2024)
- Website: wikiedu.org

The Wiki Education Foundation (sometimes called Wiki Education or Wiki Edu) is a 501(c)(3) nonprofit organization based in Chico, California, United States. It promotes the integration of editing Wikipedia into coursework by educators in the United States and Canada. The foundation recruits and provides technical assistance to professors whose students edit Wikipedia entries in place of writing a research paper.

== History ==
A pilot project was started by the Wikimedia Foundation in 2010, then called the Public Policy Initiative, to engage students and faculty from universities around the world in improving academic articles. The project spun-off into its own nonprofit after three years.

In 2016, Wiki Education chose a theme for the year, which was around improving science articles. Wiki Education argued that university students have access to academic journals and other resources that can be especially helpful when editing Wikipedia.

=== Directors ===
In 2014, Frank Schulenburg, former senior director of programs at the Wikimedia Foundation, became the organization's first executive director. Diana Strassmann was named Chair of the board of directors in 2013. In 2014, Robert Cummings, director of the Center for Writing and Rhetoric and associate professor of English at the University of Mississippi served on the board. Adrianne Wadewitz served on the board until her death in 2014.

As of June 2026, the members of the board are:

Member	Role
P.J. Tabit	Chair
Jon Cawthorne	Vice-Chair
Garfield Byrd	Treasurer
Bob Cummings	Secretary
Sue Gardner	
Carwil Bjork-James	
Richard Knipel	
Karen A. Twitchell	
