= Edit-a-thon =

Editing collaboration on a specific topic

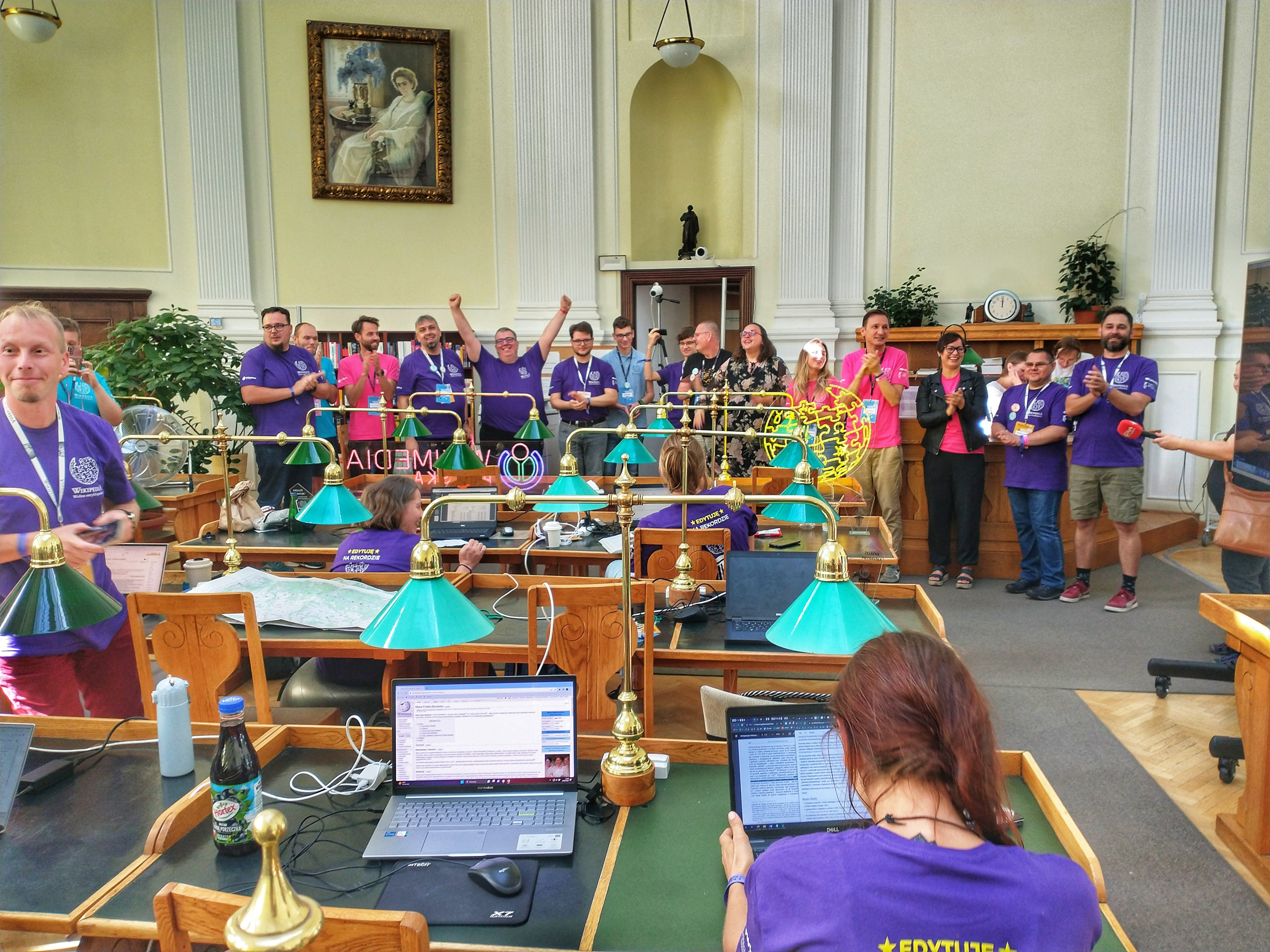
The end of the 100-hour-long edit-a-thon (recognized by the Guinness World Records) that took place in Warsaw in September 2023.

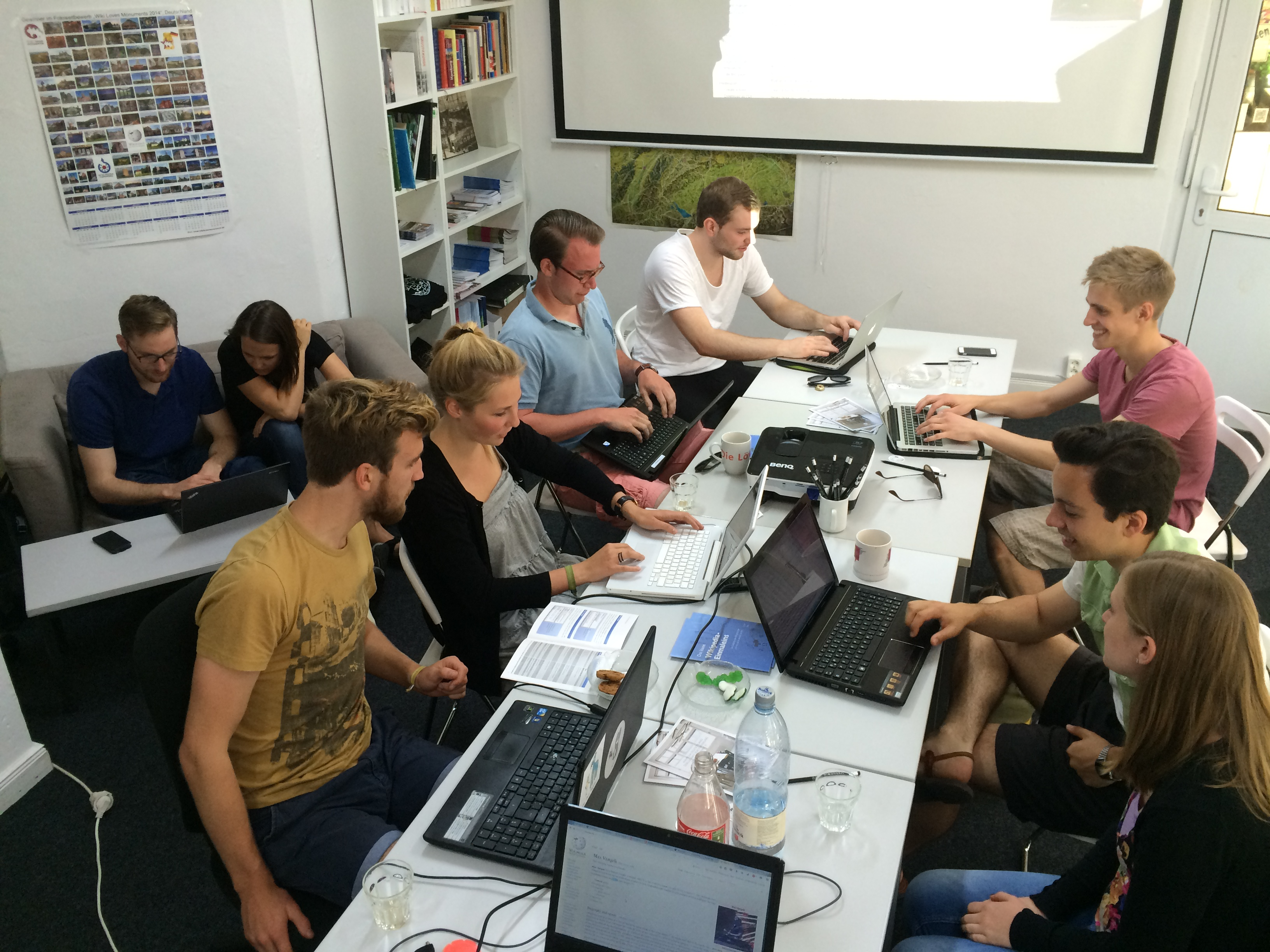
An editathon for university students in Germany

An edit-a-thon (sometimes written editathon) is an event where some editors of online communities such as Wikipedia, OpenStreetMap (also known as a "mapathon"), and LocalWiki edit and improve a specific topic or type of content. The events typically include basic editing training for new editors and may be combined with a more general social meetup. The word is a portmanteau of "edit" and "marathon". An edit-a-thon can either be "in-person" or online or a blended version of both. If it is not in-person, it is usually called a "virtual edit-a-thon" or "online edit-a-thon".

== Locations (in-person events) ==
Wikipedia edit-a-thons have taken place at Wikimedia chapter headquarters; accredited educational institutions, including Sonoma State University, Arizona State University, Middlebury College, and the University of Victoria; scientific research institutions such as the Salk Institute for Biological Sciences; and cultural institutions, such as museums or archives.

== Online/remote events ==
Several Wikipedia edit-a-thons have been held during the COVID-19 pandemic adhering to social distancing measures. These events have been held online using synchronous voice and video chat as well as asynchronous text-based platforms and discussion forums.

== Topics ==
The events have included topics such as cultural heritage sites, museum collections, women's history, art, feminism, narrowing Wikipedia's gender gap, and social justice issues.

Women, African Americans, and members of the LGBT community are using edit-a-thons to bridge the gap in Wikipedia's sexual and racial makeup and to challenge the under-representation of Africa-related topics.

== Organizers ==
Some Wikipedia edit-a-thons have been organized by Wikipedians in residence. The OpenStreetMap community has also hosted several edit-a-thons.

== Examples ==
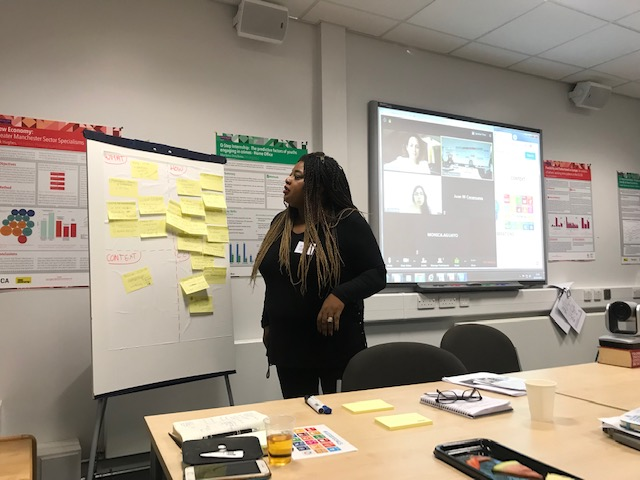
Carol Ann Whitehead, organizer of the Ada Lovelace Day Edit-a-thon

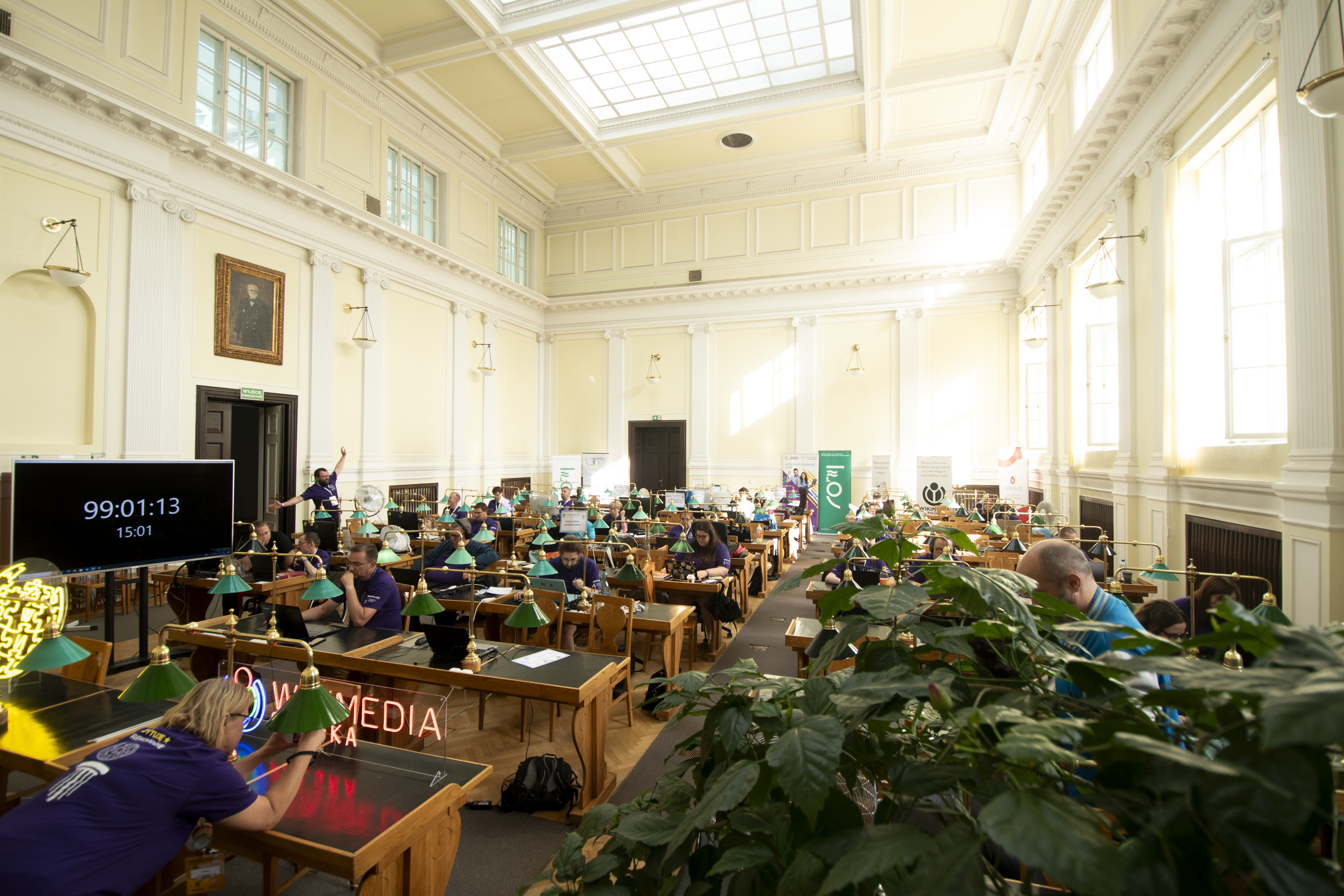
Beginning of the 100-hour-long edit-a-thon (recognized by the Guinness World Records) that took place in Warsaw in September 2023

- The "Wiki loves SDGs" initiative held a week-long online edit-a-thon on topics around the Sustainable Development Goals. The event took place online in September 2020 during Global Goals Week. It was organized by Project Everyone, an NGO in the UK, and had around 300 registered participants, 108 active contributors and 64 new editors. Most of the participants were from developing countries and seven out of the nine prize winners were from Africa. The event focused on improving SDG-related content on the English Wikipedia (some improvements were also made to the Spanish, Macedonian, Catalan and Portuguese Wikipedias). About 500 articles were improved. Jimmy Wales attended the closing ceremony and presented the nine awards to the most engaged volunteers.
- In August 2018, Future Climate for Africa and the Climate and Development Knowledge Network convened the first African Wikipedia edit-a-thon on climate change in Cape Town South Africa.
- The longest edit-a-thon recognized by Guinness World Records took place first in 2016 (from June 9 to 12) at the Museo Soumaya in Mexico City where Wikimedia Mexico volunteers and museum's staff edited during 72 continuous hours. In 2023, this record was broken by Polish wikipedians (see below).
- Since 2014, Art+Feminism has held world-wide edit-a-thons annually to expand the histories of women, feminism, and arts found on Wikipedia, and to dismantle the biases on how women are represented online. 2019 marks the expansion of the movement to include "gender non-binary activists and artists".
- The global Ada Lovelace Day Edit-a-thon, an initiative to improve the diversity of Wikipedia articles, was co-created by Carol Ann Whitehead and Google Expert, Susan Dolan. It took place on October 9, 2019, in Manchester at The Pankhurst Centre.
- In 2023 the first 100-hour-long edit-a-thon, recognized by Guinness World Records, was organized in Warsaw, Poland, from September 26 to 30, to celebrate Polish Wikipedia's 22nd birthday. It took place at the Warsaw Public Library – Central Library of the Masovian Voivodeship, and 127 editors participated in the event, but additional volunteers also helped to support it.

== Gallery ==
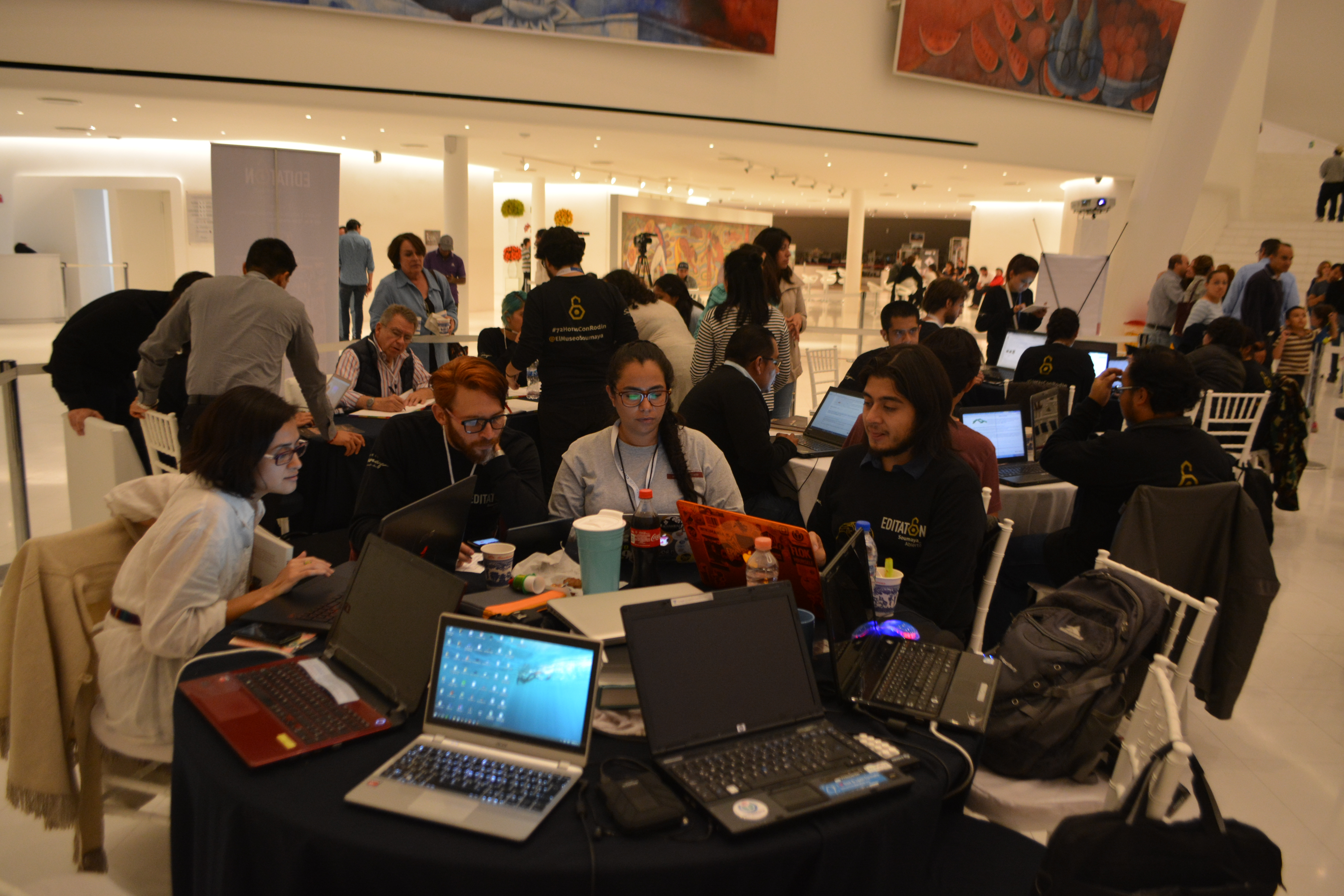
The 72 horas con Rodin edit-a-thon in Mexico City was the longest ever until the Warsaw edit-a-thon overtook it.

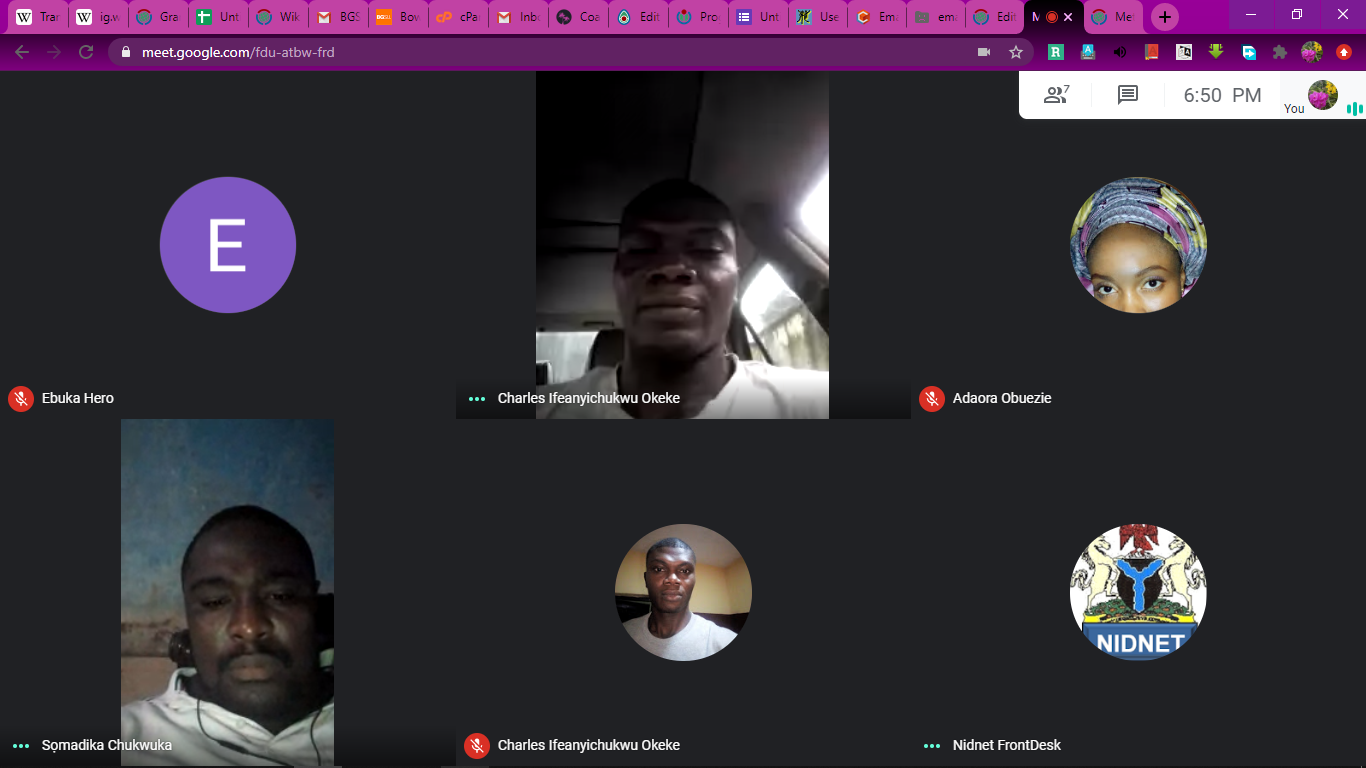
Cross section of participants at the Igbo Wiktionary virtual edit-a-thon in August 2020

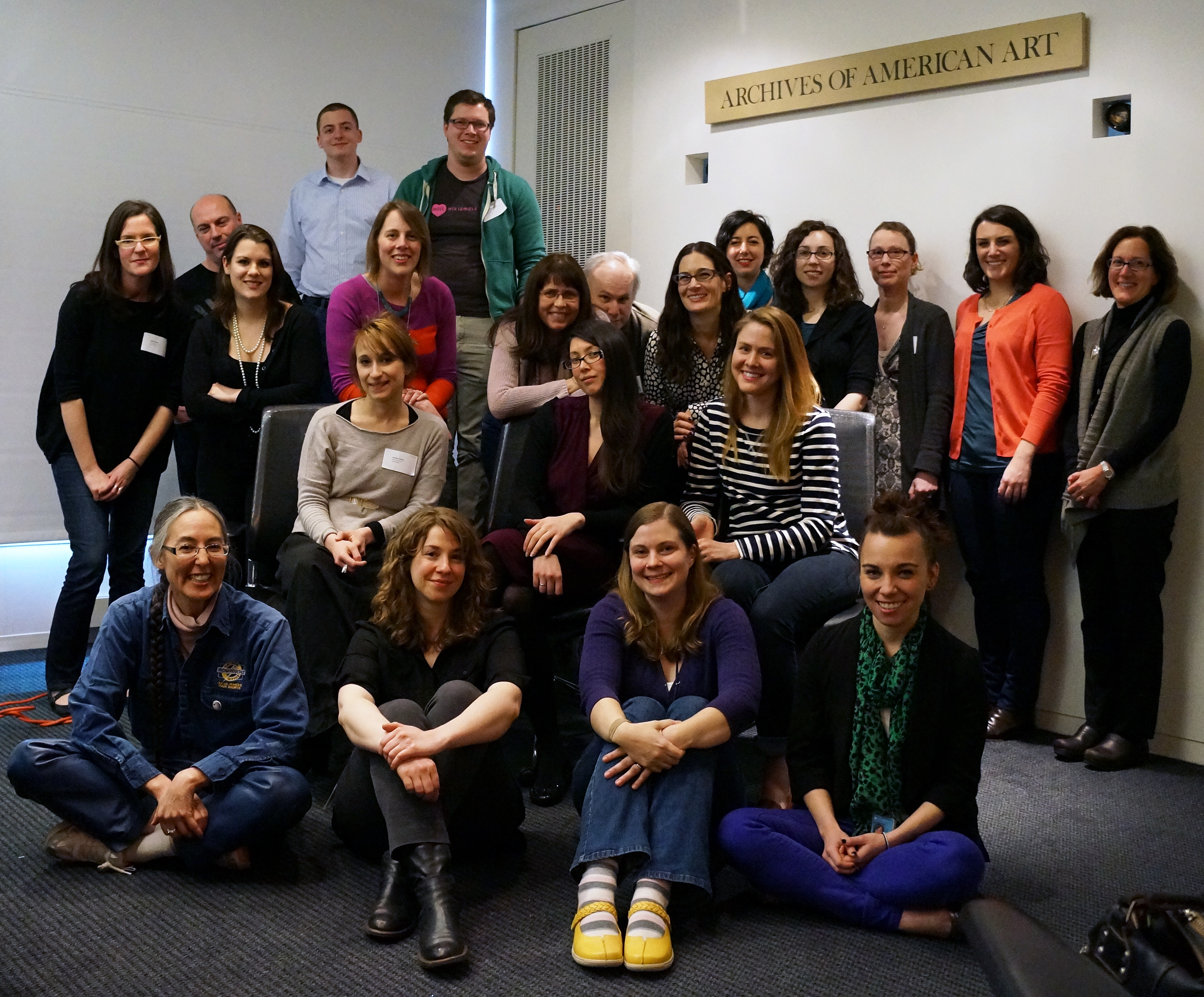
Attendees at the 2013 Women in the Arts Edit-a-thon in Washington, DC

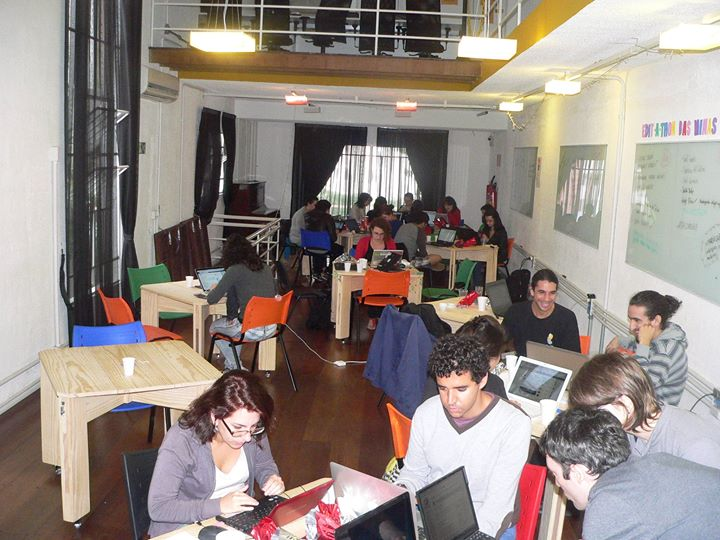
An edit-a-thon in São Paulo, Brazil, aimed at creating and improving Wikipedia articles relating to feminism, women's rights and notable women

AfroCrowd Manager Sherry Antoine explaining edit-a-thons

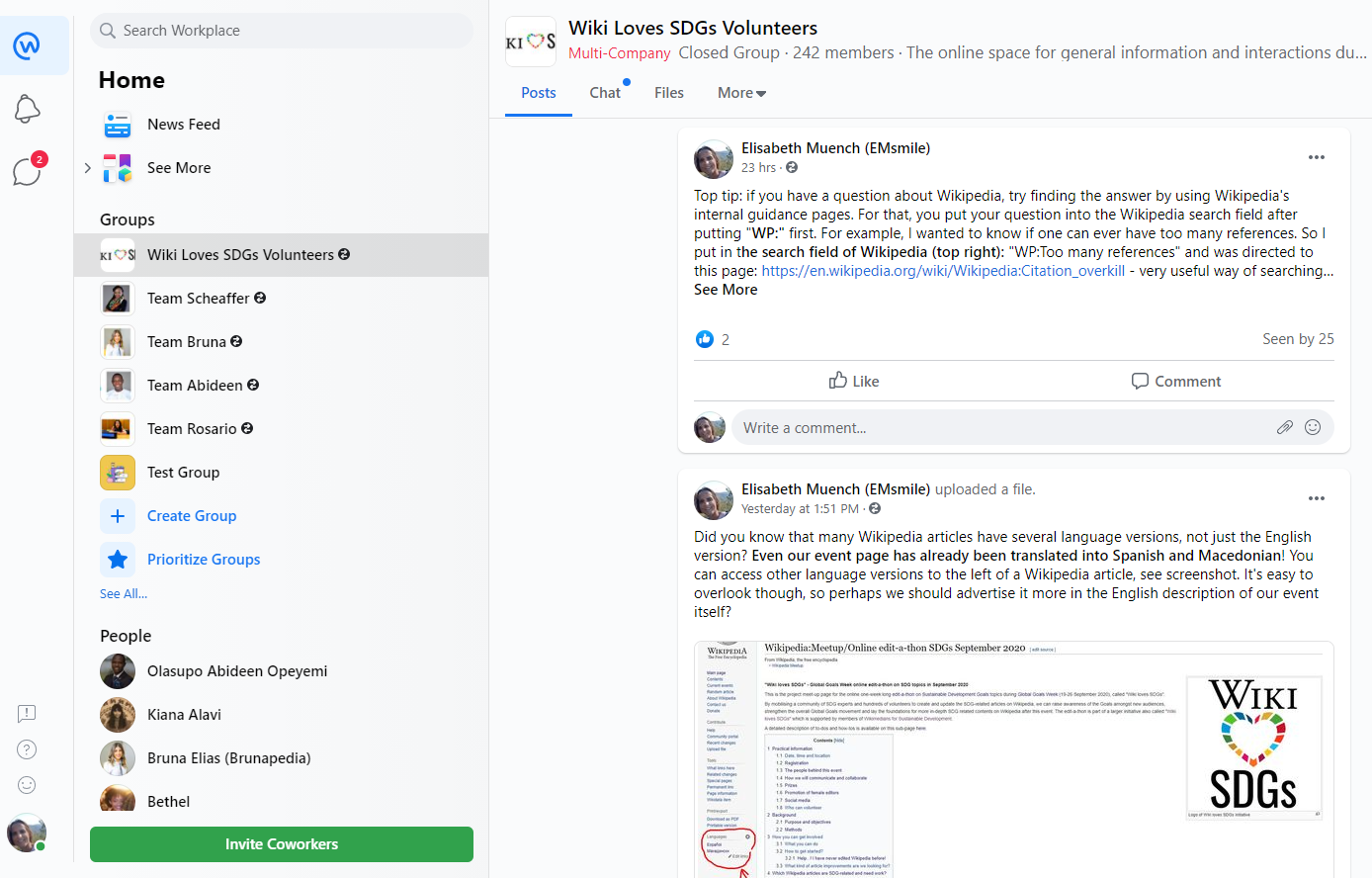
Virtual workroom for the online edit-a-thon on SDG topics in September 2020 (using Workplace by Facebook)

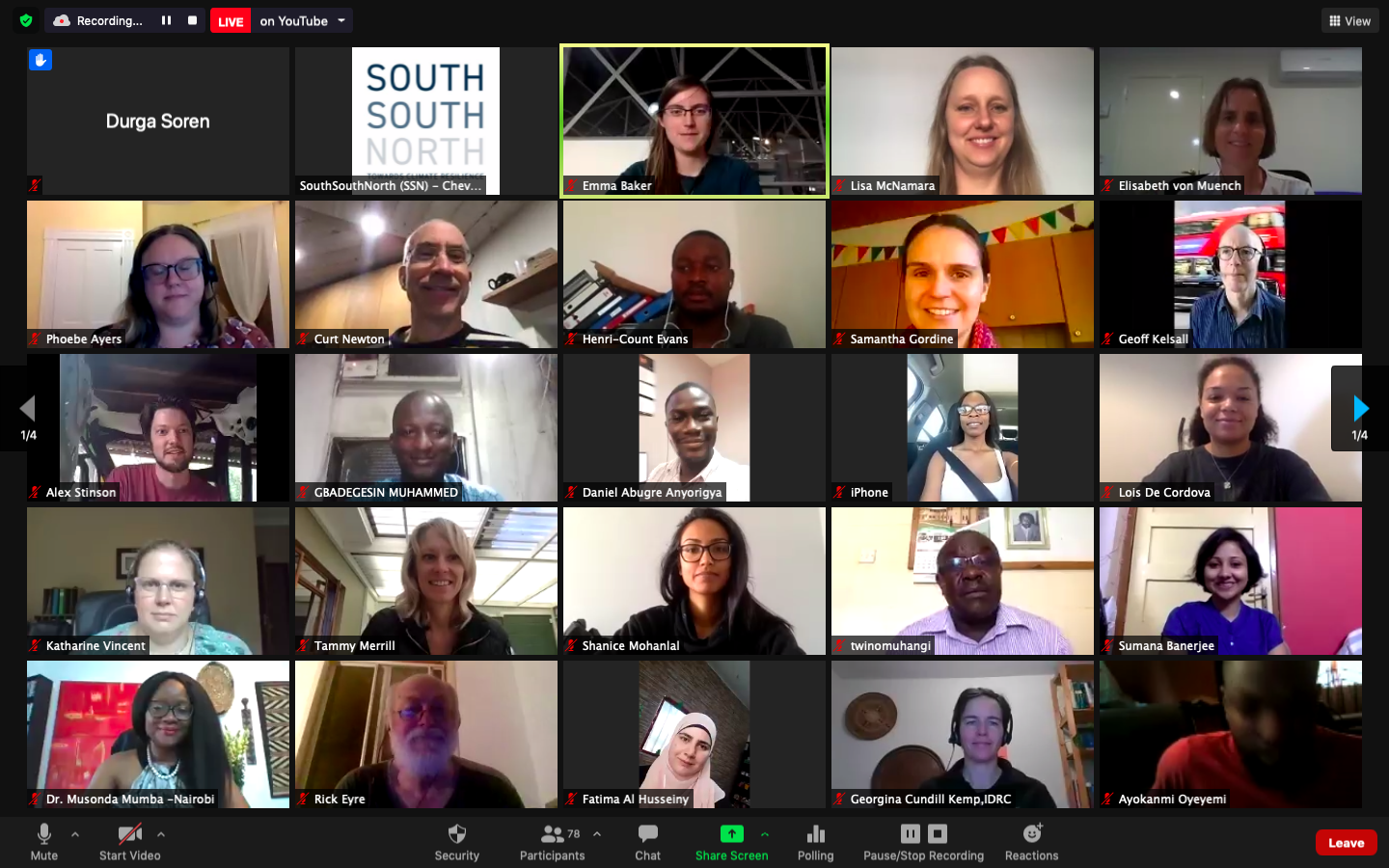
"Wiki4Climate" opening session group photo in November 2020

== See also ==
- Hackathon
- Wikipedia:Meetup
- WikiGap Challenge on Meta-wiki - Example of high-impact virtual edit-a-thon / writing challenge in March 2020
- Meta-wiki Category:Edit-a-thons
- Meta-wiki Category:Wikimedia meetups
