= Steven Pruitt =

American Wikipedia editor (born 1984)

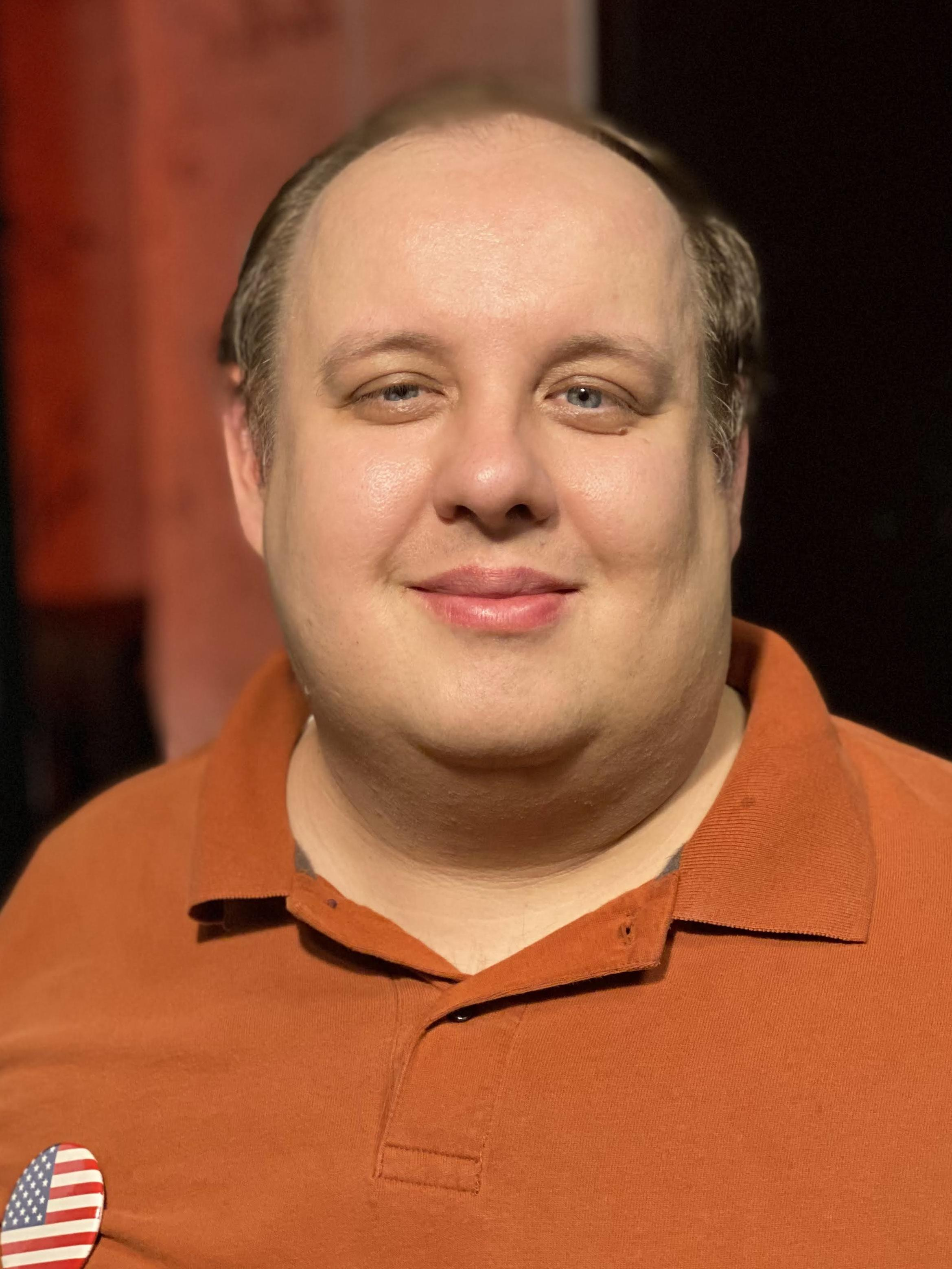
- Pruitt in 2022
- Born: April 17, 1984 (age 42); San Antonio, Texas, U.S.
- Education: College of William & Mary (BA)
- Years active: 2004–present
- Known for: Most edits on English Wikipedia
- Honors: Time's "The 25 Most Influential People on the Internet" (2017)

Steven Pruitt (/ˈpruːɪt/ PROO-it; born April 17, 1984), known online as Ser Amantio di Nicolao, is an American Wikipedia editor and administrator who has made the largest number of edits made to the English Wikipedia, at 7 million, having edited at least a third of its articles. Pruitt first began editing Wikipedia in 2004. He has also created more than 33,000 Wikipedia articles. Pruitt was named as one of the 25 most important influencers on the Internet by Time magazine in 2017.

Pruitt's pseudonym is a reference to a minor character in Giacomo Puccini's 1918 opera Gianni Schicchi. He has stated that he aims to fight gender bias on Wikipedia, promoting the inclusion of women via Women in Red, a WikiProject.

== Early life ==
Pruitt was born on April 17, 1984, in San Antonio, Texas, the only child of Alla Pruitt, a Russian Jewish immigrant, and Donald Pruitt of Richmond, Virginia. His mother emigrated from the Soviet Union following the loosening of the policy on Jewish migration under Leonid Brezhnev, while his father worked as a college professor in Virginia. They met when they were both teachers in the Defense Language Institute's Russian Department at Lackland Air Force Base, close to San Antonio.

While growing up, Pruitt was a reader of classical literature and mystery stories by Agatha Christie and Ngaio Marsh. Pruitt has credited his love of knowledge to his mother's stories of growing up in the Soviet Union.

Pruitt graduated from St. Stephen's & St. Agnes School in Alexandria, Virginia, in 2002. He attended the College of William & Mary, where he sang as part of a choir, and he graduated in 2006 with a degree in art history.

== Career ==
In 2017, Pruitt was a subcontractor for U.S. Customs and Border Protection, where he worked with records and information. In 2020, he became a records manager at the Defense Health Agency. As of 2021, he works for Chenega IT Enterprise Services, a contractor for the Defense Health Agency.

== Wikipedia editing ==
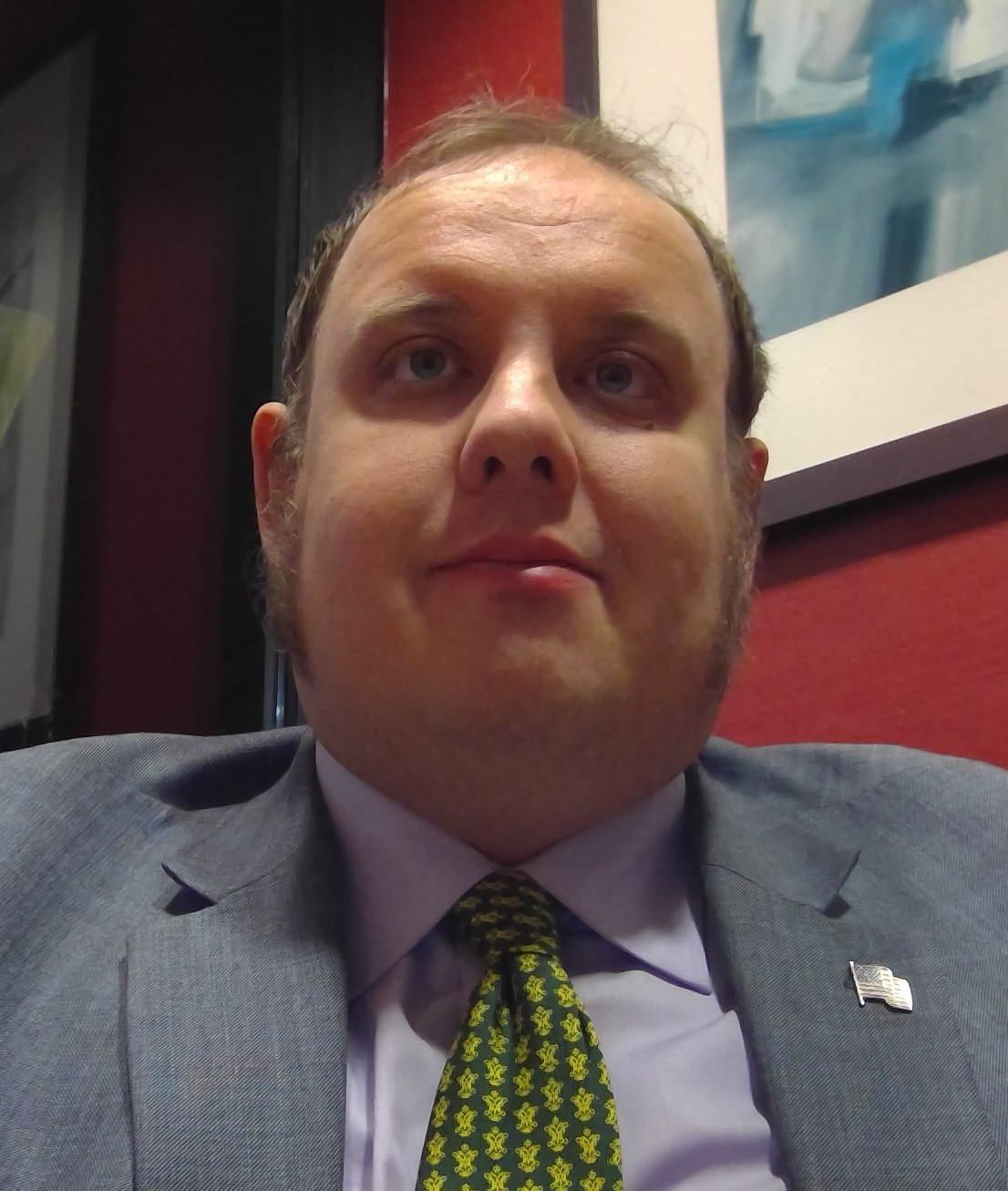
Pruitt in 2018

Pruitt began editing Wikipedia in June 2004. His first Wikipedia article was about his great-great-great-great-great-great-grandfather Peter Francisco, a Portuguese-born American Revolutionary War hero known as the "Virginia Hercules". His favorite article to work on is for the Pohick Church in Virginia. He created his current account in January 2006 while a senior at the College of William & Mary. Prior to creating his current account, he had edited under several accounts for which he kept forgetting the password. Being unemployed during the 2008 financial crisis, Pruitt spent hours editing. This activity sometimes prevented him from getting job interviews when potential interviewers confused the site with Julian Assange's WikiLeaks. In 2015, he surpassed editor Justin Knapp for the most edits. The same year, he became an administrator. By February 2019, Pruitt had made over three million edits to Wikipedia, more than any other editor on the English Wikipedia, and he made over four million edits by February 2021. Pruitt has also created more than 33,000 Wikipedia articles, the seventh-highest tally out of any Wikipedia editor. He normally uses an automated tool, AutoWikiBrowser, for editing. According to Northern Virginia Magazine:

Pruitt has not literally pressed the "edit" button 4.4 million times. One method he has used to achieve his astonishing numbers is a software tool that allows a user to make numerous identical edits simultaneously. For example, he could italicize every mention of Northern Virginia magazine across Wikipedia where it currently appears in standard font. Yet it is claimed he has not "cheated" his way to the top spot, since that software is also available to others.

As a contributing member of the Women in Red WikiProject, his Wikipedia edits have included creating articles on more than 600 women, in an effort to counter the site's gender gap. Even though the majority of his work is done alone, he is also a member of the WikiProject for Virginia. Pruitt identifies as an inclusionist, preferring to retain articles instead of deletion. He also considers himself a WikiGnome, a type of editor that makes small, behind-the-scenes edits. Pruitt spends between three and four hours daily editing, with more on the weekends. The longest Pruitt has gone without editing Wikipedia since he began is two or three weeks. He made the one billionth edit on the English Wikipedia on January 13, 2021, to the page "Death Breathing".

=== Interviews ===
Pruitt giving a self-introduction

Pruitt was featured on CBS This Morning in January 2019. In the interview, Pruitt described the first article he worked on about Francisco, as well as his commitment to help boost Wikipedia's coverage of notable women.

Pruitt's focus on female artists, composers, and historical figures reflects his interest in shedding light on lesser-known and often overlooked subjects. He has actively contributed to addressing the gender gap on Wikipedia, recognizing that the representation of biographical articles about women has seen growth, from around 14% to the current figure of nearly 18%, due in part to his efforts and the creation of initiatives such as the Women in Red project. He mentioned this in one of his interviews. In 2026, Pruitt was the subject of an exposé by The New Yorker.

== Personal life ==
Pruitt's non–Wikipedia-related interests include the Capitol Hill Chorale, in which he sings. He is a fan of opera, which started from his parents' inculcation at an early age and provided inspiration for his Wikipedia username "Ser Amantio di Nicolao"—after a minor character in the 1918 Puccini opera Gianni Schicchi. Pruitt is also a fan of classical music. As of 2026, he lives in Alexandria, Virginia with his mother, due to the high costs of housing in the Washington, D.C., area.

== Distinctions ==
- Time's "The 25 Most Influential People on the Internet" (2017)

== See also ==
- List of Wikipedia people
