= Wikipedia and fact-checking =

Culture and practice of fact-checking on Wikipedia

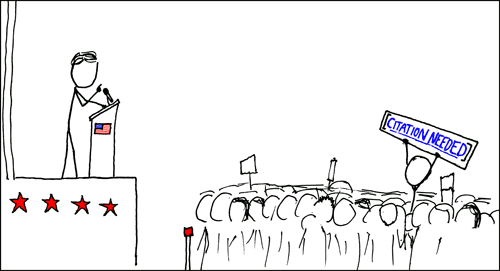
Wikipedia's practice of flagging unsubstantiated information with "citation needed" warnings has become almost synonymous with the need for fact checking more generally.

Wikipedia's volunteer editor community has the responsibility of fact-checking Wikipedia's content. This process is intended to improve the reliability of Wikipedia and curb the dissemination of misinformation and disinformation by the website.

Various academic studies about Wikipedia and the body of criticism of Wikipedia seek to describe the limits of Wikipedia's reliability, document who uses Wikipedia for fact-checking and how, and what consequences result from this use. Wikipedia articles can have poor quality in many ways including self-contradictions. Those poor articles require improvement.

Large platforms including YouTube and Facebook use Wikipedia's content to confirm the accuracy of the information in their own media collections.

== Using Wikipedia for fact-checking ==
Wikipedia serves as a public resource for access to genuine information. For example, the COVID-19 pandemic was an important topic on which people relied on Wikipedia for genuine information. Seeking public trust is a major part of Wikipedia's publication philosophy. Various reader polls and studies have reported public trust in the English Wikipedia's process for quality control. In general, the public uses Wikipedia to counter fake news.

=== YouTube fact-checking ===
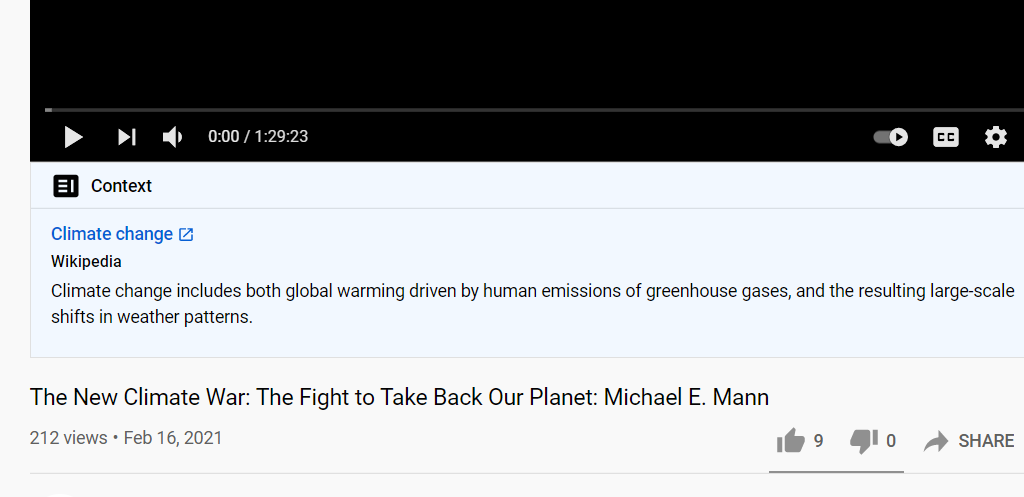
YouTube using Wikipedia for fact-checking

At the 2018 South by Southwest conference, YouTube CEO Susan Wojcicki made the announcement that YouTube was using Wikipedia to fact check videos which YouTube hosts. No one at YouTube had consulted anyone at Wikipedia about this development, and the news at the time was a surprise. The intent at the time was for YouTube to use Wikipedia as a counter to the spread of conspiracy theories. This is done by adding new information boxes under some YouTube videos, thereby, attracting conspiracy theorists.

=== Facebook fact-checking ===
Facebook uses Wikipedia in various ways. Following criticism of Facebook in the context of fake news around the 2016 United States presidential election, Facebook recognized that Wikipedia already had an established process for fact-checking. Facebook's subsequent strategy for countering fake news included using content from Wikipedia for fact-checking. In 2020, Facebook began to include information from Wikipedia's info boxes in its own general reference knowledge panels to provide objective information.

=== Professional fact-checkers ===
Mike Caulfield and Sam Wineburg adapt an approach to fact checking as a type of media literacy, suggesting that information seekers emphasize lateral reading (or skimming multiple reliable sources instead of thoroughly examining one), including by using Wikipedia as a starting point for learning about a topic.

Renée DiResta in her 2024 book advised victims of rumors, misinformation or disinformation to ensure that factual information was available online, including on Wikipedia, especially in an era when AI chatbots often rely on Wikipedia for information.

== Fact-checking Wikipedia ==
Fact-checking is one aspect of the general editing process in Wikipedia. The volunteer community develops a process for reference and fact-checking through community groups such as WikiProject Reliability. Wikipedia has a reputation for cultivating a culture of fact-checking among its editors. Wikipedia's fact-checking process depends on the activity of its volunteer community of contributors, who numbered 200,000 as of 2018.

The development of fact-checking practices is ongoing in the Wikipedia editing community. One development that took years was the 2017 community decision to declare a particular news source, the British Daily Mail newspaper, a middle-market tabloid-size conservative newspaper, as generally unreliable as a citation for verifying claims. Through strict guidelines on verifiability, Wikipedia has been combating misinformation. According to Wikipedia guidelines, all articles on Wikipedia's "mainspace" must be verifiable.

== Limitations ==
When Wikipedia experiences vandalism, platforms that reuse Wikipedia's content may republish that vandalized content. In 2016, journalists described how vandalism in Wikipedia undermines its use as a credible source.

Article vandalism is prohibited by Wikipedia. The website suggests these steps for inexperienced beginners to handle vandalism: access, revert, warn, watch, and finally report.

In 2018, Facebook and YouTube were major users of Wikipedia for its fact-checking functions, but those commercial platforms were not contributing to Wikipedia's free nonprofit operations in any way.

== See also ==
- Circular reporting on Wikipedia

== Further consideration ==
- Anker, Andrew; Su, Sara; Smith, Jeff (October 5, 2017). "New Test to Provide Context About Articles". About Facebook. Facebook, Inc.
- Mohan, Neal; Kyncl, Robert (July 9, 2018). "Building a better news experience on YouTube, together". blog.youtube. YouTube.
