= Anthony Knapp =

Anthony Knapp may refer to:

- Anthony L. Knapp (1828–1881), U.S. Representative from Illinois
- Anthony W. Knapp (born 1941), American mathematician
- Tony Knapp (1936–2023), British footballer

== See also ==
- Justin Anthony Knapp (born 1982), Wikipedian
- Tony Knap (1914–2011), college football coach
