= Margaret Ferguson (political scientist) =

American political scientist

- Born: October 10, 1968 (age 57); Hattiesburg, Mississippi, U.S.
- Education: University of Southern Mississippi (BA); University of North Carolina at Chapel Hill (MA, PhD)
- Known for: State politics, governors, Southern politics, welfare politics, American politics
- Scientific career
- Fields: Political science
- Workplaces: Indiana University – Purdue University Indianapolis

Margaret Robertson Ferguson (born October 10, 1968) is an American political scientist specializing in state politics, governors, and Southern politics at Indiana University – Purdue University Indianapolis.

== Early life and education ==
Ferguson was born in Hattiesburg, Mississippi, the daughter of Jim Robertson, a one-time member of the Mississippi Legislature and political science professor from Liberty, Mississippi. She graduated with a BA in political science from the University of Southern Mississippi. She earned an MA and Ph.D. from the University of North Carolina-Chapel Hill.

== Scholarship and academic career ==
Ferguson joined the academic staff of Indiana University – Purdue University Indianapolis in 1996. Now a professor, in 2012 she was head of the Department of Political Science, and was named assistant vice president for statewide academic relations at the university.

She was one of Justin Knapp’s professors, and has said she was not surprised by his dedication to editing Wikipedia.

Ferguson's research includes comparing the structures of state-level government institutions in the United States and analyzing legislative procedures. She is often quoted in news reports about political issues. She writes opinion articles for the Indianapolis Business Journal, and has also written a number of other articles about American politics. In 2015 a book she edited, The Executive Branch of State Government: People, Process, and Politics, is in the collections of more than 700 libraries.

In 2016, she became senior associate vice chancellor for academic affairs at IUPUI.

== Selected publications ==
- "Governors and the Executive Branch", in Politics in the American States: A Comparative Analysis.
- The Executive Branch of State Government: People, Process, and Politics (editor), ABC-CLIO, 2006
- Assessing Perceived Gubernatorial Influence on State Administrators, 1978–1988, University of North Carolina at Chapel Hill, 1992.
- "Divided Government, Interest Representation, and Policy Differences: Competing Explanations of Gridlock in the Fifty States", CJ Bowling, MR Ferguson – Journal of Politics, 2001.
