= Women in Red =

Wikipedia collaboration to address gender bias

- Logo (with Kamma Rahbek's silhouette)
- Formation: July 18, 2015; 11 years ago
- Founder: Roger Bamkin; Rosie Stephenson-Goodknight
- Founded at: Hilton Mexico City Reforma during Wikimania 2015
- Type: WikiProject
- Purpose: Elimination of gender bias on Wikipedia
- Headquarters: Virtual
- Methods: Edit-a-thons
- Staff: None
- Awards: 2016, shortlisted, ITU/UN Women's GEM-TECH Award
- Website: w.wiki/347

Women in Red is a Wikipedia WikiProject to address systemic bias regarding gender representation (content gender gap) in the Wikimedia movement. The project was established in July 2015 at Wikimania Mexico City by Roger Bamkin and Rosie Stephenson-Goodknight, with the aim of addressing the gender bias in Wikipedia content. The project focuses on creating content regarding women's biographies, women's works, and women's issues. The project is named after the hyperlinks in existing Wikipedia articles that display in red to indicate that the linked article has yet to be created.

Since the inception of Ada Lovelace Day, an annual event held to celebrate and raise awareness of the contributions of women to STEM fields, Wikipedia edit-a-thons have been popular activities. Research at these events often discovers notable women in STEM who did not have Wikipedia pages, revealing red links that represented nonexistent articles awaiting creation.

== Background and history ==
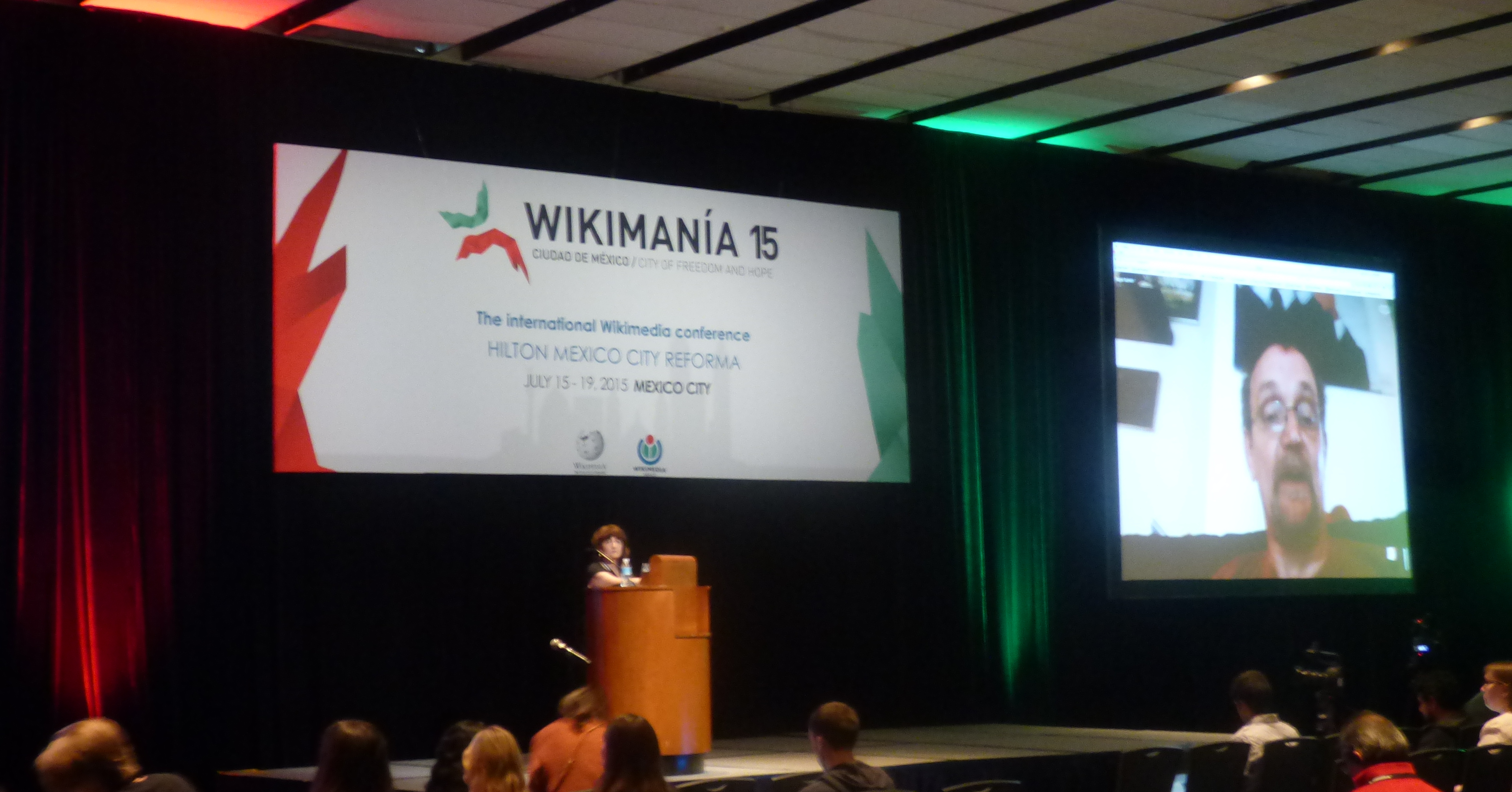
Stephenson-Goodknight and Bamkin (appearing via Skype) announcing the formation of Women in Red during Wikimania 2015 in Mexico City

Women in Red was conceived by volunteer Wikipedia editor Roger Bamkin in 2015, who subsequently joined forces with volunteer editor Rosie Stephenson-Goodknight. Bamkin had initially coined a name for the project, "Project XX", but the name was soon changed to WikiProject Women in Red. After the project was established, volunteer editor Emily Temple-Wood signed on. She gained prominence for stating she will add a new Wikipedia article about a female scientist each time she is harassed for her volunteer editing efforts. Jess Wade has written over 1750 articles about women and minorities to address the gender gap in the sciences and engineering on wikipedia.

The project was influenced by academic studies that presented gender bias within wikipedia. One paper about the issue is entitled "First Women, Second Sex: Gender Bias in Wikipedia" and was published in 2015. One example of the gender gap was that physicist Donna Strickland did not have a biography on Wikipedia until she won the Nobel Prize in Physics in 2018. Before she won the award, Strickland's page had been rejected by editor who wrote: "This submission's references do not show that the subject qualifies for a Wikipedia article." However, the men with whom she shared the Nobel Prize both had biography articles.

=== Article deletion ===
According to some researchers and observers, articles about women are disproportionately nominated for deletion on Wikipedia. Others have noticed articles about women being flagged for deletion on Wikipedia. Francesca Tripodi, a sociologist, monitored deletion discussions for years. She noted: "[articles about women] met the criteria for inclusion at a point where they shouldn't have been (on the Articles for Deletion list) to begin with. If there weren't networks like Women in Red devoted to saving these articles, these articles would have been deleted."

== Methods ==
Women in Red presentation by Roger Bamkin, Wikimania 2017

Women in Red conducts Wikipedia edit-a-thons in cities around the world, and continuously hosts a virtual one. The all-day in-person edit-a-thons are focused events conducted to train new contributors so that the Wikipedia gender gap can become narrower and include more content on notable women.

Another goal is to increase the number of female editors. Though Wikipedia is "the free encyclopedia that anyone can edit", as of 2015, about only 10% of editors were women. In 2024, only about 14% of Wikipedia’s editors were women.

The Women in Red participants helped to collate 150 work lists of red linked articles to make it easier to find and create the missing articles.

== Impact ==
By December 2016, Women in Red volunteer editors had added over 45,000 articles, and the percentage of tallied articles had increased marginally to 16.8% of English-language biographies (from 15% in July 2015). The project created approximately 175,000 articles in five years.

In addition to the direct impact of the WikiProject, Women in Red has also inspired other initiatives aimed at increasing the representation of women on Wikipedia. This has taken the form of stand-alone edit-a-thons, annual Women in Red edit-a-thons as part of other WikiProjects, and whole new WikiProjects.

=== Studies ===
By December 2024, the proportion of biographies for women on English Wikipedia had reached 20%, in part due to the Women in Red project. A study suggested that, among biology faculty at top U.S. research universities, women are more likely than men to have biographies on Wikipedia. In 2018, men biologists were more likely to have a dedicated Wikipedia page, and that trend reversed in 2022. This shift could likely be attributed to Women in Red, with nearly half of biographies about women biologists being written by volunteers affiliated with the project.

== Awards and honours ==
- 2016, shortlisted, ITU/UN Women's GEM-TECH Award (category: Apply Technology for Women's Empowerment and Digital Inclusion)
- At Wikimania 2016, in Esino Lario, Italy, Jimmy Wales, who co-founded Wikipedia in 2001, named Stephenson-Goodknight and Temple-Wood the Wikipedians of the Year, for the prior 12 months, for their effort to fill the gender information gap.
- At Wikimania 2026, in Paris, France, WiR was voted as "The Coolest Project" of the last 25 years.

== See also ==
- Gender bias on Wikipedia
- Art+Feminism
- Nancy Poore
