= Justin Knapp =

American Wikipedian (born 1982)

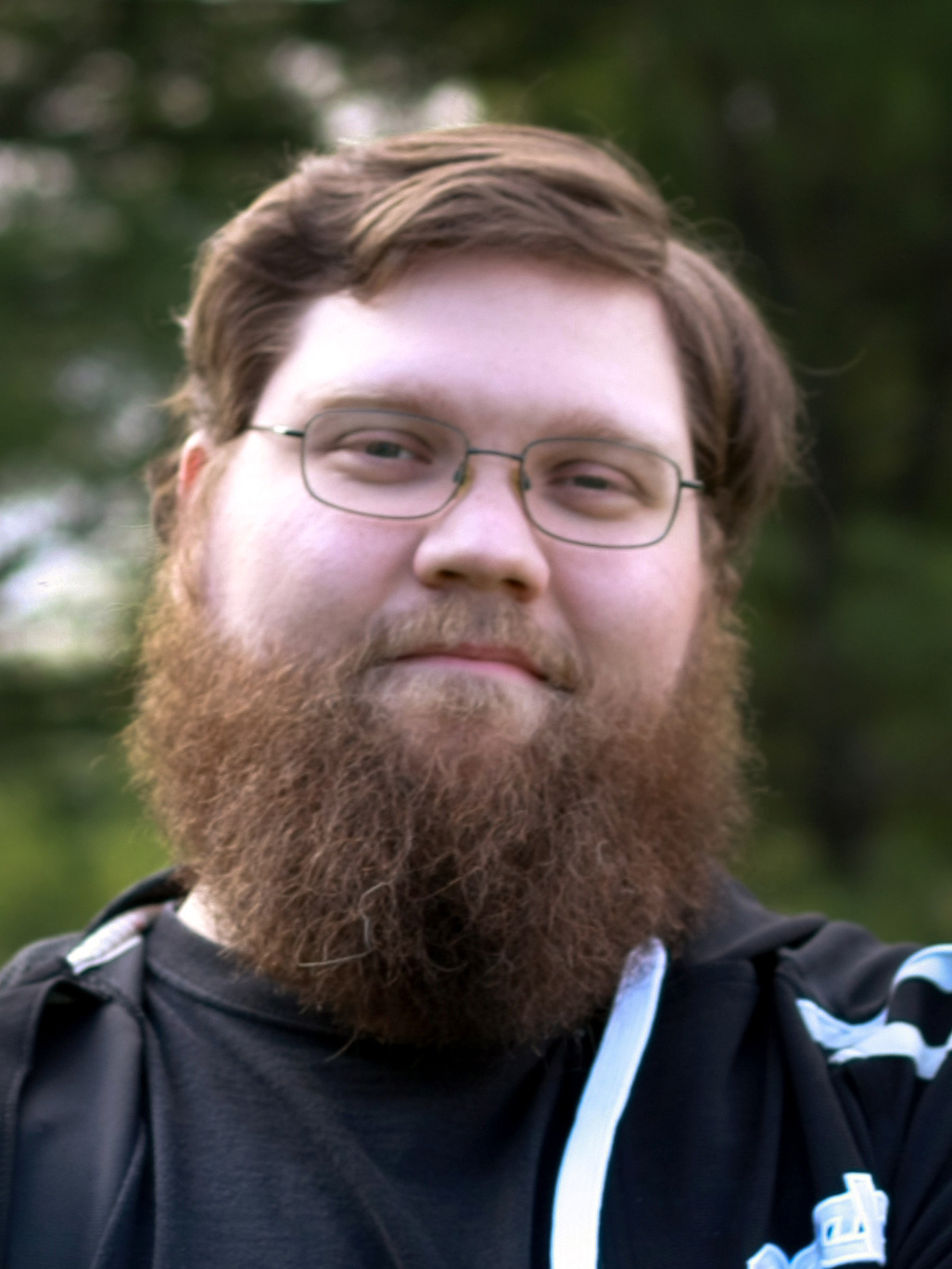
- Knapp in 2012
- Born: Justin Anthony Knapp; November 18, 1982 (age 43); Indianapolis, Indiana, U.S.
- Other name: Koavf
- Education: Indiana University–Purdue University Indianapolis
- Justin Knapp's voice Knapp introducing himself Recorded July 22, 2014

Justin Anthony Knapp (born November 18, 1982), known online as Koavf, is an American former Wikipedia editor who was the first person to contribute more than one million edits to Wikipedia. As of May 2025, Knapp has made over 2.1 million edits on the English Wikipedia. He was ranked No. 1 among the most active Wikipedia contributors of all time from April 18, 2012, to November 1, 2015, when he was surpassed by Steven Pruitt. Knapp has been banned from editing the site since July 2024.

== Education ==
Knapp attended Covenant Christian High School in Indianapolis, Indiana, where he enrolled in 1997. He holds degrees in philosophy and political science from Indiana University–Purdue University Indianapolis.

== Career ==
=== Wikipedia ===
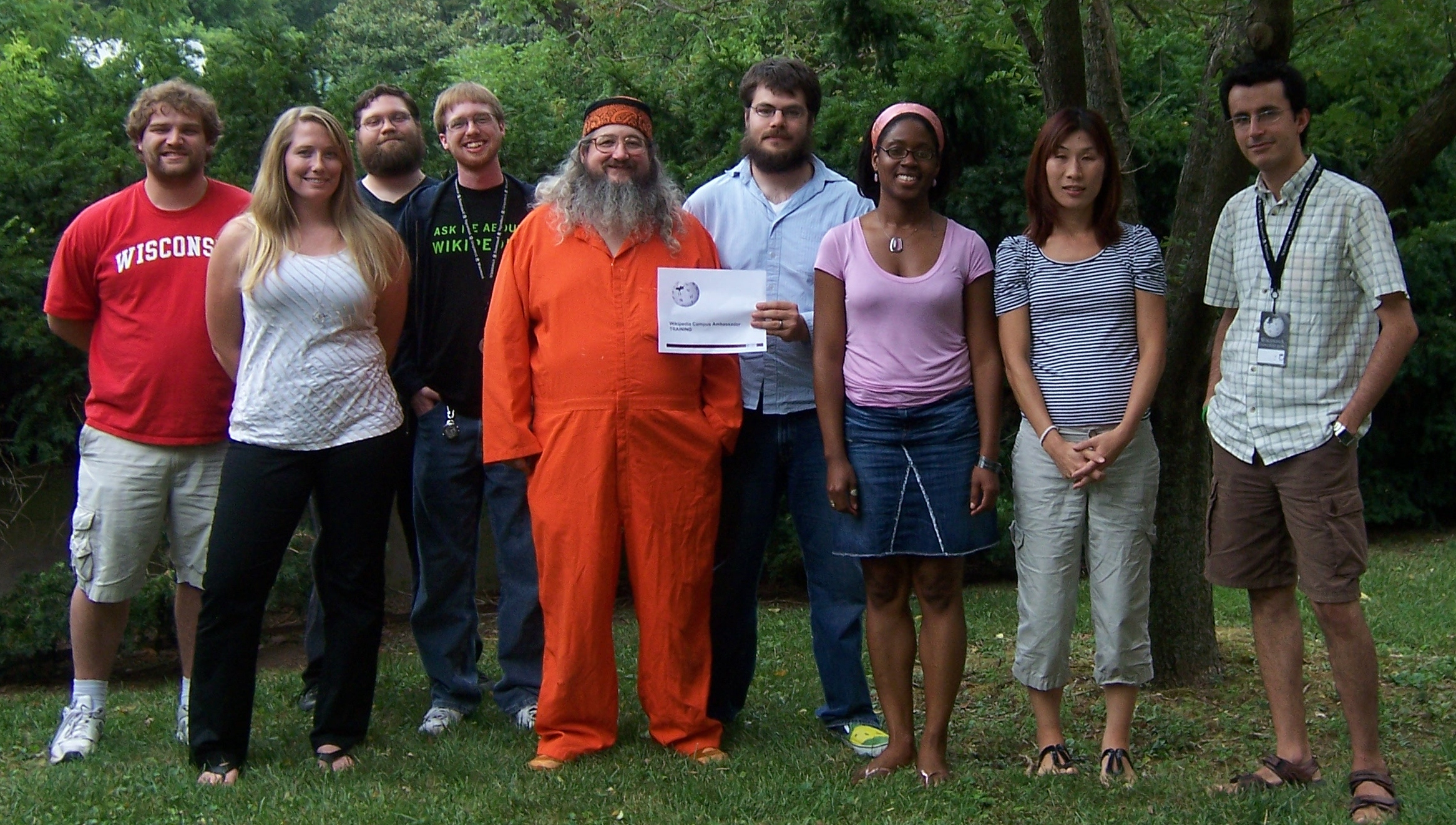
Knapp (third from left) at a Wikipedia training session in 2011

Knapp announced his millionth edit to Wikipedia on April 19, 2012. At the time, he had been submitting on average 385 edits a day since signing up in March 2005; about his performance he said: "Being suddenly and involuntarily unemployed will do that to you." Margaret Ferguson, an associate professor of political science at Indiana University–Purdue University Indianapolis and one of Knapp's professors, said she was not surprised by his dedication to editing Wikipedia. In 2012, Wikipedia co-founder Jimmy Wales congratulated Knapp for his work and presented him with the site's highest award for his achievement by declaring that April 20 would be Justin Knapp Day.

His Wikipedia username, Koavf, was chosen as an acronym for "King of all Vext Fans", a reference to a contest Knapp entered for Vext in the 1990s. Knapp was a significant contributor to Wikipedia's bibliography of George Orwell, and he has also made many edits involving the categorization of albums through Wikipedia's category structure. In 2012, the Indianapolis Star reported that Knapp sometimes edited Wikipedia for as many as 16 hours a day.

In a 2014 interview with Business Insider, Knapp said that "there is no typical day" with regard to his Wikipedia editing, and that his "go-to edits are small style and typo fixes". He also argued that the declining number of Wikipedia editors is "not necessarily a problem". Knapp, who has been blocked from editing multiple times, said in a 2015 interview with technology journalist Zachary Crockett that he "wouldn't be surprised if I've been banned more than anyone". In July 2024, he was banned from the English Wikipedia following a community discussion.

=== Activism ===
In 2005, at the United Nations Sixtieth General Assembly, Knapp advocated for the Sahrawi people and spoke about the situation in Western Sahara. He has also been involved in community organizing for a Restore the Fourth rally in 2013.

=== Other ===
Knapp has had several jobs, including delivering pizzas for the Indianapolis pizzeria Just Pizza, working at a grocery store, and working at a crisis hotline.

== See also ==
- History of Wikipedia
- List of Wikipedia people
