= Epistemology of Wikipedia =

Philosophical area of study

Early analysis related the epistemology of Wikipedia to social epistemology. Other realms of epistemological research, such as the epistemology of testimony and epistemic value theory, have been studied with reference to Wikipedia.

More recent analysis suggests that the epistemology of Wikipedia derives from the combined epistemic values of wikis and of encyclopedias. Jankowski cites Ruth and Houghton who define the epistemic values of wikis as:

- self-identification
- collaboration
- co-construction
- cooperation
- trust in the community
- constructionism

Jankowski suggests that determination of the epistemic values of encyclopedias is more problematic, requiring genre analysis. This analysis revealed that encyclopedias value:

- utility
- systematic organization
- authority
- trust in experts
- consistency

Fallis previously identified the specific epistemic virtues of Wikipedia as

- power
- speed
- fecundity
