= English Wikipedia =

English-language edition of Wikipedia

- Modified version of the logo of English Wikipedia celebrating its 25th anniversary

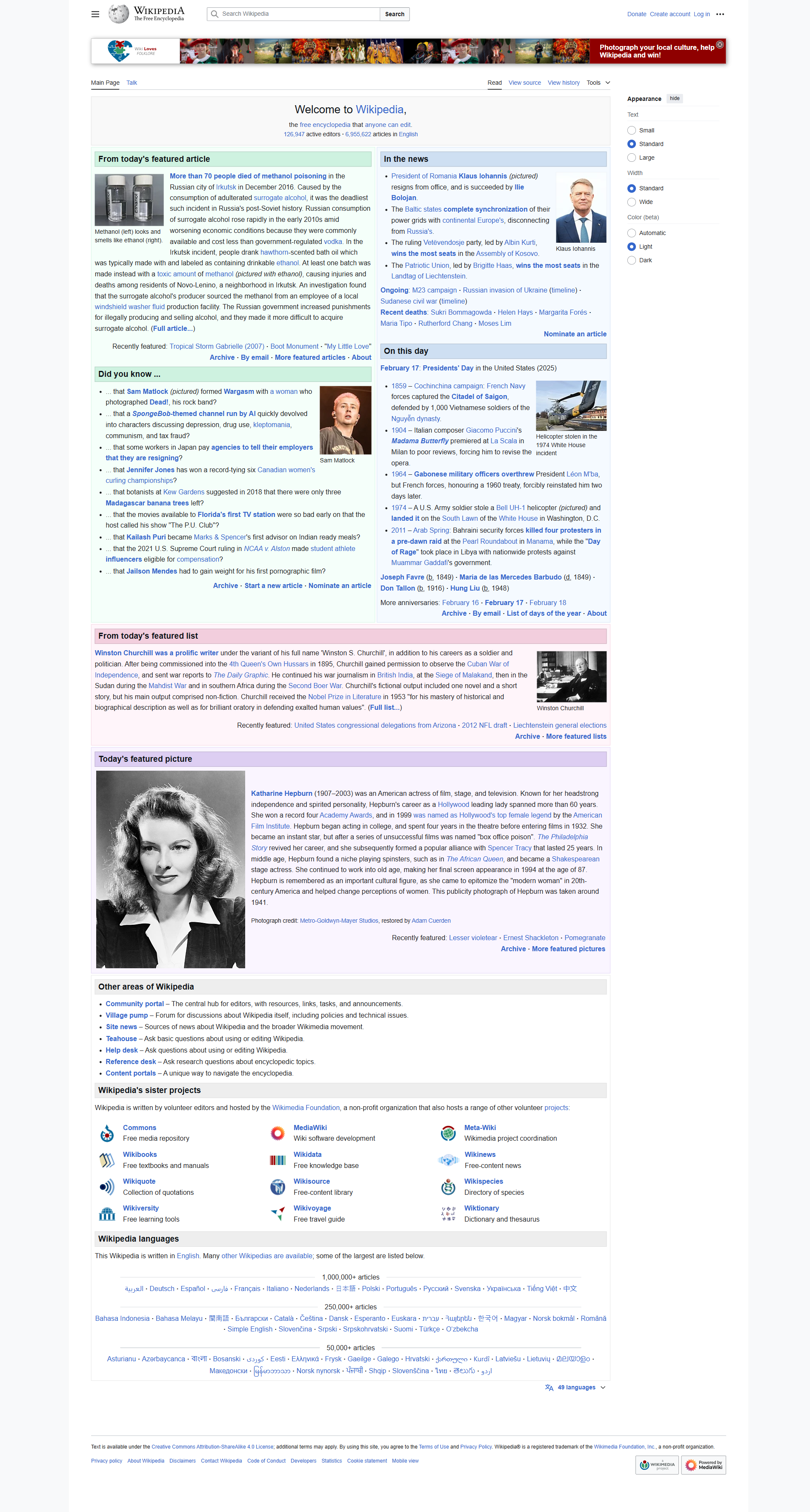
- Screenshot The English Wikipedia's Main Page on 17 February 2025
- Website type: Online encyclopedia
- Available in: English
- Owner: Wikimedia Foundation
- Founders: Jimmy Wales; Larry Sanger
- Editor: English Wikipedia community
- Website: en.wikipedia.org
- Commercial: No
- Registration: Optional; required for certain tasks
- Users: 55.3 million (as of 6 November 2026)
- Launched: 15 January 2001; 25 years ago
- Content license: Creative Commons Attribution/ Share-Alike 4.0 (most text also dual-licensed under GFDL); Media licensing varies
- Written in: PHP

The English Wikipedia is the primary (Note: The other edition is Simple English Wikipedia, which uses Basic English.) English-language edition of Wikipedia, an online encyclopedia. It was created by Jimmy Wales and Larry Sanger on 15 January 2001, as Wikipedia's first edition.

The English Wikipedia is hosted alongside other language editions by the Wikimedia Foundation, an American nonprofit organization. Its content, written independently of other editions by volunteer editors known as Wikipedians, is in various varieties of English while aiming to stay consistent within articles. Its internal newspaper is The Signpost.

The English Wikipedia is the most read version of Wikipedia, accounting for 48% of Wikipedia's cumulative traffic, with the remaining percentage split among the other languages. The English Wikipedia has the most articles of any edition, at 7,259,901 as of November 2026. (Note: The number of articles on the English Wikipedia is shown by the MediaWiki variable {{NUMBEROFARTICLES}}, with all Wikipedias as total {{NUMBEROF|ARTICLES|total}} = 68,687,603.) It contains 10.6% of articles in all Wikipedias, although it lacks millions of articles found in other editions.

English Wikipedia, often as a stand-in for Wikipedia overall, has been praised for its enablement of the democratization of knowledge, extent of coverage, unique structure, culture, and reduced degree of commercial bias. It has been criticized for exhibiting systemic bias, particularly gender bias against women and ideological bias. While its reliability was frequently criticized in the 2000s, it has improved over time, receiving greater praise in the late 2010s and throughout the 2020s, (Note: Despite this praise, Wikipedia does not recognize itself as a reliable source.) having become an important fact-checking site. English Wikipedia has been characterized as having less cultural bias than other language editions due to its broader editor base.

== Articles ==
Article count at beginning of indicated year

Increase in number of articles during indicated year

Opening English Wikipedia's main page with Mozilla Firefox 99 on Ubuntu 20.04

The English Wikipedia surpassed seven million articles on 28 May 2025. In November 2022, the total volume of the compressed texts of its articles amounted to 20 gigabytes.

The edition's one-billionth edit was made on 13 January 2021 by Ser Amantio di Nicolao (Steven Pruitt) who was as of that date and remains as of January 2026 the user with the highest number of edits on the English Wikipedia, at over four million (as of January 2026, this figure was more than 6.7 million, as per Wikipedia statistics). Currently, there are 7,259,901 articles created with 979,688 files. The encyclopedia is home to 10.6% of articles in all Wikipedias (down from more than 50% in 2003). The English Wikipedia currently has 55,323,510 registered accounts of which 816 are administrators.

== Bureaucracy ==
Editors of the English Wikipedia have pioneered some ideas as conventions, policies or features which were later adopted by Wikipedia editions in some of the other languages. These ideas include "featured articles", the neutral-point-of-view policy, navigation templates, the sorting of short "stub" articles into sub-categories, dispute resolution mechanisms such as mediation and arbitration, and weekly collaborations.

== Wikipedians ==
The countries in which the English Wikipedia is the most popular language version of Wikipedia are shown in red.

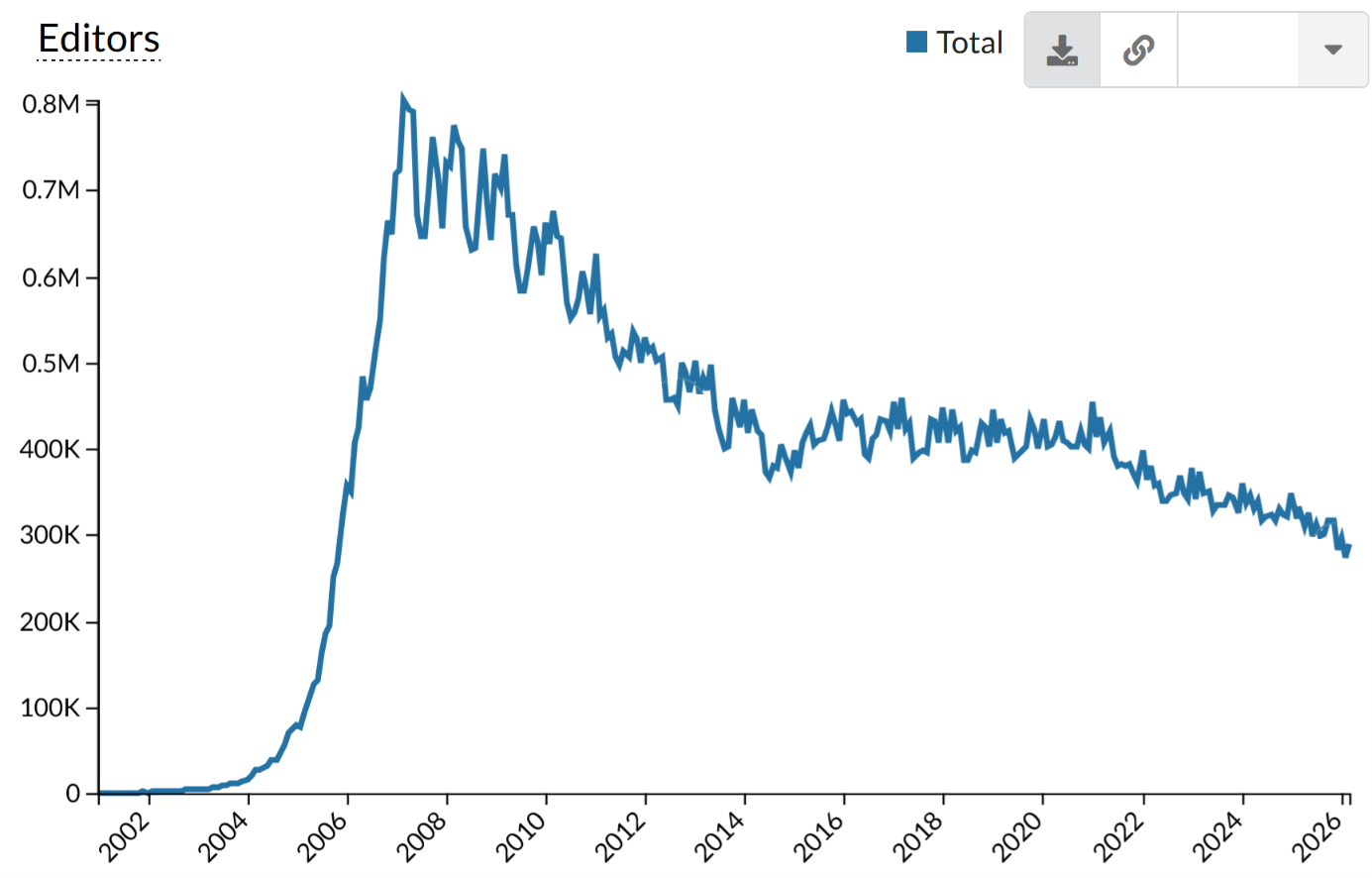
Number of volunteer editors on the English Wikipedia over time

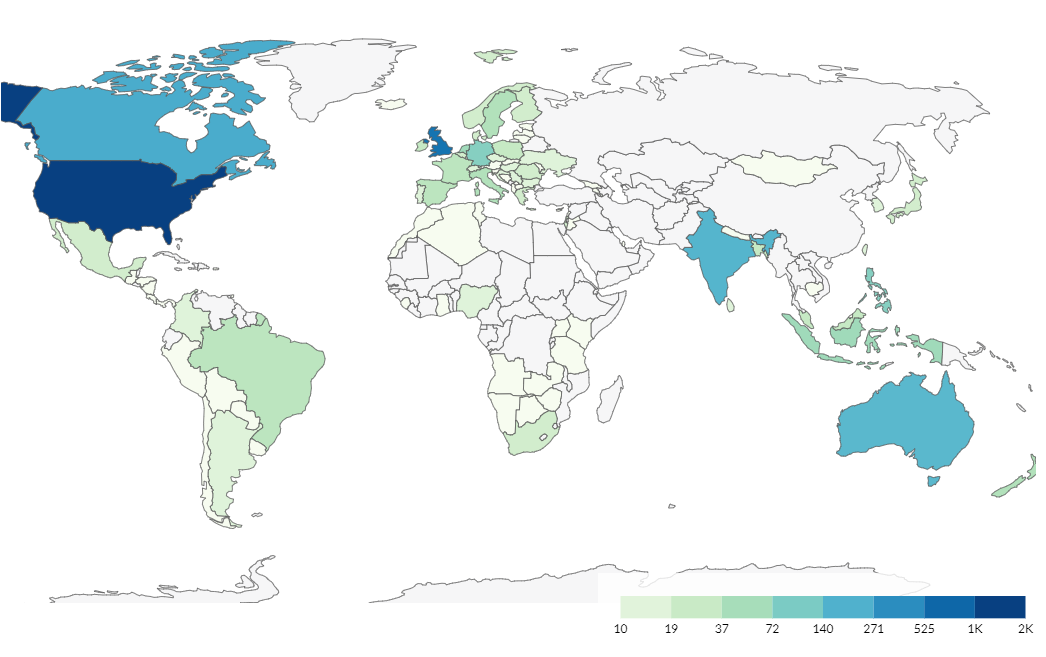
Number of active editors on the English Wikipedia with more than 100 edits per month by country as of January 2022

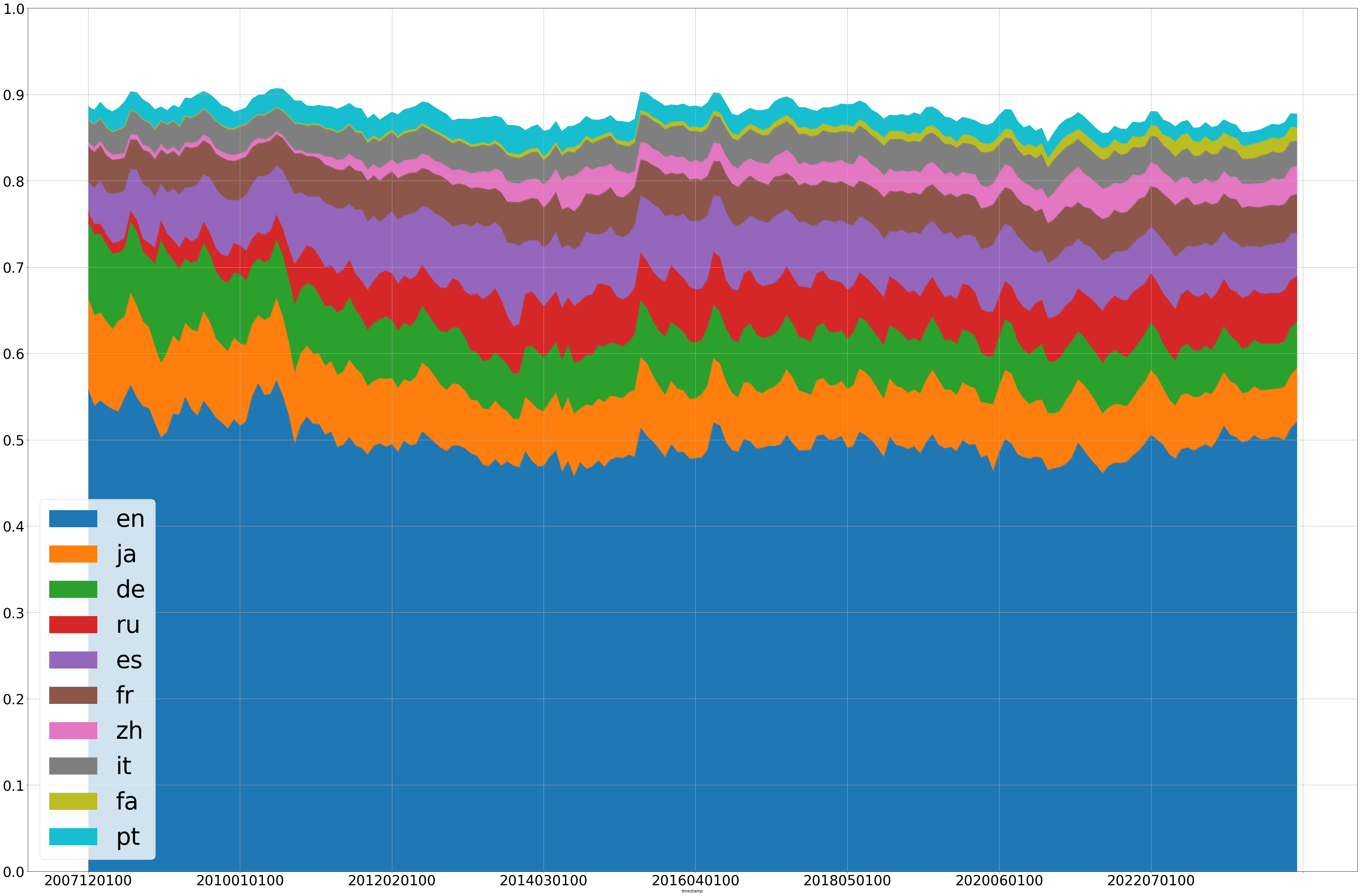
The English Wikipedia (marked blue in the graph) is the most-read version of Wikipedia, accounting for 48% of the website's global traffic as of 2021.

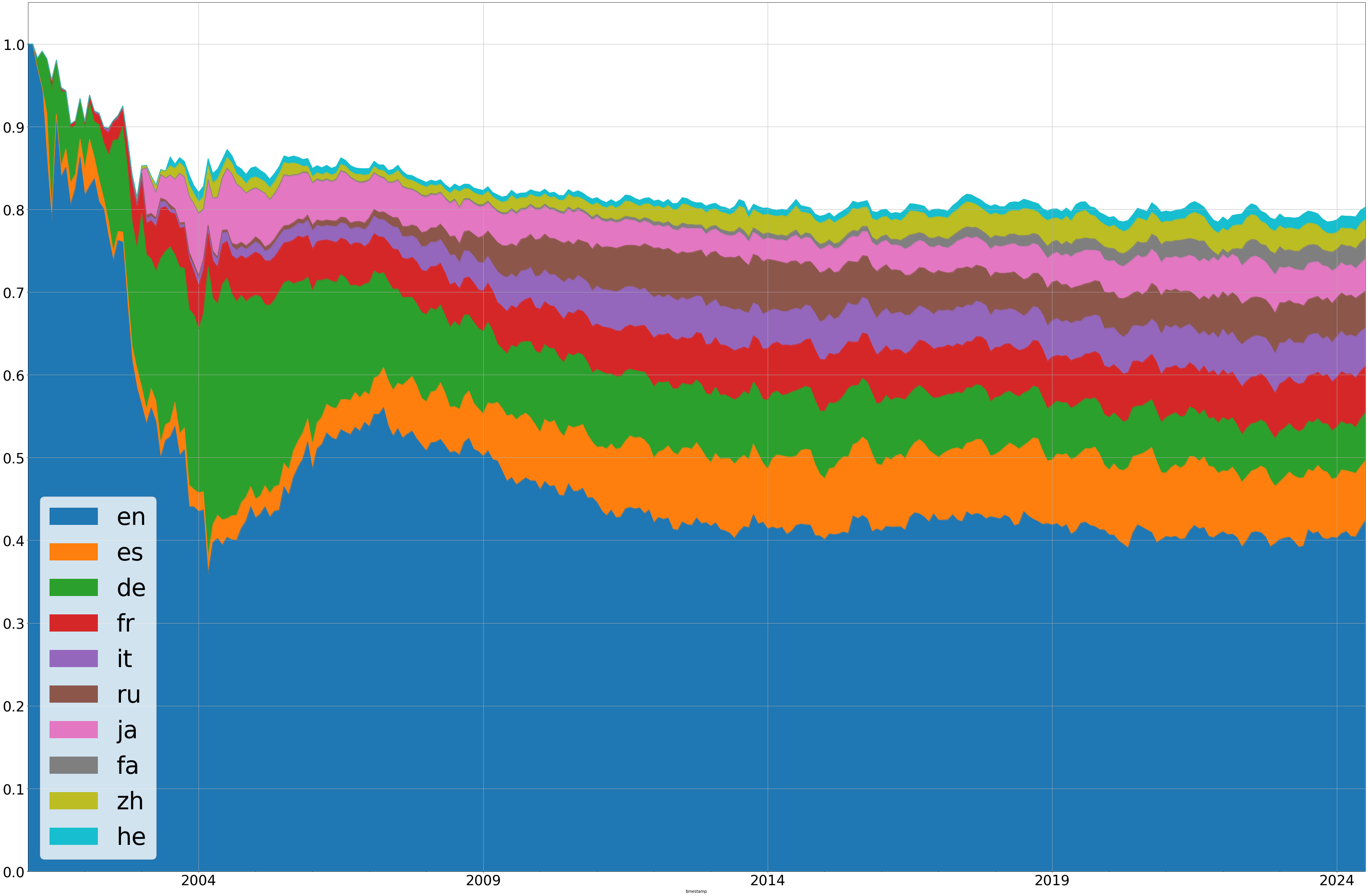
The English Wikipedia has consistently been the most edited Wikipedia language version.

The English Wikipedia reached 4,000,000 registered user accounts on 1 April 2007, over a year since the millionth Wikipedian registered an account in February 2006.

Over 1,100,000 volunteer editors have edited Wikipedia more than 10 times. Over 30,000 editors perform more than 5 edits per month, and over 3,000 perform more than 100 edits per month.

On 1 March 2014, The Economist, in an article titled "The Future of Wikipedia", cited a trend analysis concerning data published by the Wikimedia Foundation stating that "[t]he number of editors for the English-language version has fallen by a third in seven years." The attrition rate for active editors in English Wikipedia was cited by The Economist as substantially in contrast to statistics for Wikipedia in other languages (non-English Wikipedia). The Economist reported that the number of contributors with an average of five or more edits per month was relatively constant since 2008 for Wikipedia in other languages at approximately 42,000 editors within narrow seasonal variances of about 2,000 editors up or down. The number of active editors in English Wikipedia, by "sharp" comparison, was cited as peaking in 2007 at approximately 50,000 and dropping to 30,000 by the start of 2014.

The trend analysis published in The Economist presents Wikipedia in other languages (non-English Wikipedia) as successful in retaining their active editors on a renewable and sustained basis, with their numbers remaining relatively constant at approximately 42,000.

The English Wikipedia has the Arbitration Committee (also known as ArbCom) that consists of a panel of editors that imposes binding rulings with regard to disputes between other editors of the online encyclopedia. It was created by Jimmy Wales on 4 December 2003 as an extension of the decision-making power he had formerly held as owner of the site. When it was founded, the committee consisted of 12 arbitrators divided into three groups of four members each.

In 2022, for English Wikipedia, Americans accounted for about 40% of active editors, followed by British and Indian editors accounting for about 10% of each, and Canadian and Australian editors at about 5%.

== Criticism ==
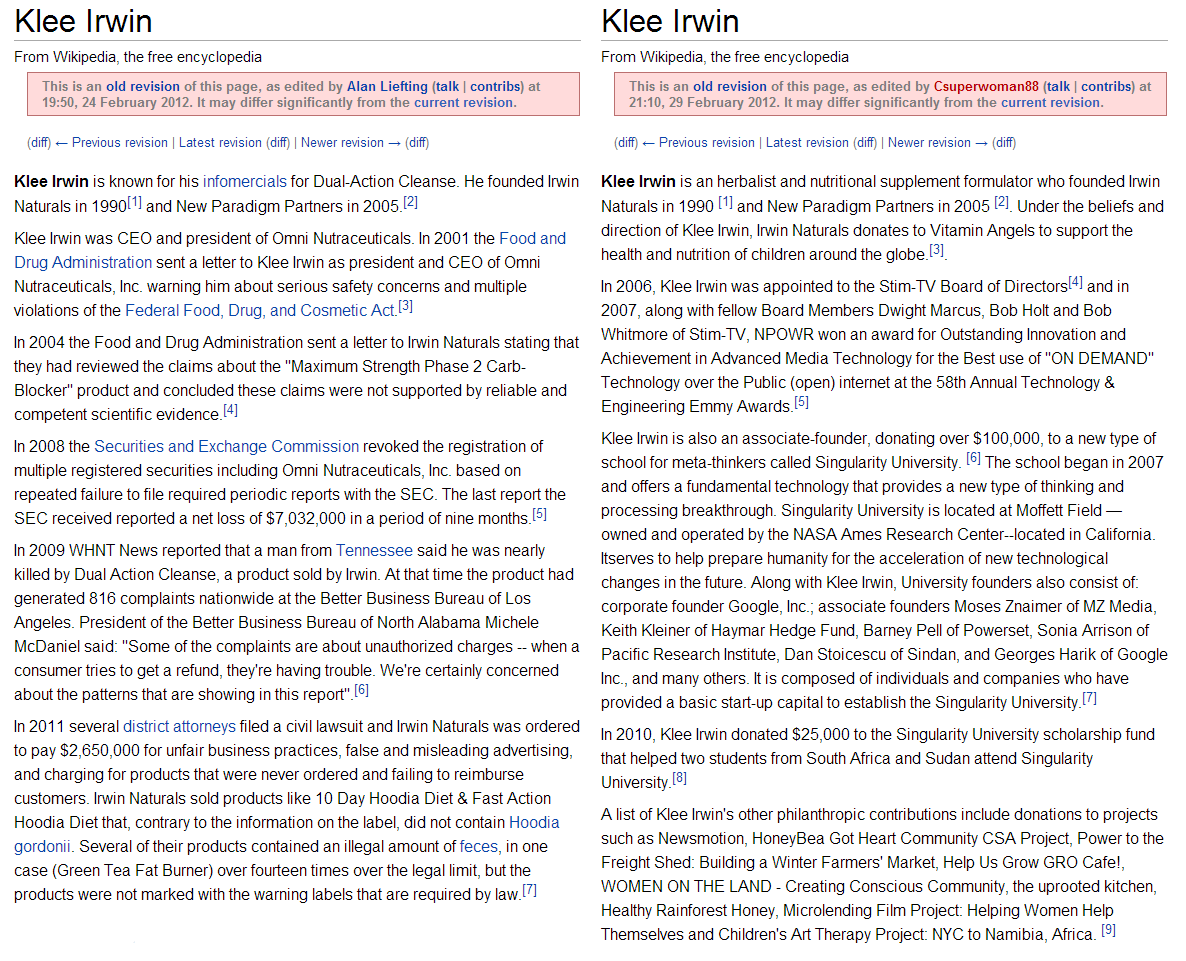
Two radically different versions of the Wikipedia biography Klee Irwin (now deleted) presented to the public within days of each other: Wikipedia's susceptibility to edit wars and bias is an issue often raised by the project's critics.

The free online encyclopedia Wikipedia has been criticized since its creation in 2001. Most of the criticism has been directed toward its content, community of established volunteer users, process, and rules. Critics have questioned its factual reliability, the readability and organization of its articles, the lack of methodical fact-checking, and its political bias.

Concerns have also been raised about systemic bias along gender, racial, political, corporate, institutional, and national lines. Conflicts of interest arising from corporate campaigns to influence content have also been highlighted. Further concerns include the vandalism and partisanship facilitated by anonymous editing, clique behavior (from contributors as well as administrators and other top figures), social stratification between a guardian class and newer users, excessive rule-making, edit warring, and uneven policy application.

== Controversies ==
=== English varieties ===
A notable discussion within the English Wikipedia community concerns the preference for national variety of the English language, particularly American English and British English. Various suggestions have been made, ranging from standardizing a single form of English to creating separate versions of the English Wikipedia project. According to a style guideline, "the English Wikipedia has no general preference for a major national variety of the language" and "an article on a topic that has strong ties to a particular English-speaking nation uses the appropriate variety of English for that nation."

=== Disputed articles ===
A 2013 study from Oxford University found that the most disputed articles on the English Wikipedia tend to address broader, global issues. In contrast, articles on other languages' Wikipedias often focus on regional issues. This pattern is attributed to the status of English as a global lingua franca, leading to contributions from many editors for whom English is a second language. The study identified the most disputed entries on the English Wikipedia as George W. Bush, anarchism, Muhammad, list of WWE personnel, global warming, circumcision, United States, Jesus, race and intelligence, and Christianity.

Research published in 2024 determined that several groups of connected accounts had coordinated to promote Russian propaganda narratives and state-controlled media sources in articles, related to Russian-Ukrainian relations and Russia's war with Ukraine.

=== Threats against high schools ===
There have been reports of threats of violence against high schools made on Wikipedia. In 2006, a 14-year-old was arrested for making a threat against Niles West High School on Wikipedia. In 2008, Glen A. Wilson High School was the subject of such a threat.

=== Media blackout for David Rohde's kidnapping ===
In 2009, the English Wikipedia participated in the media blackout of the kidnapping of David Rohde, with Jimmy Wales saying at the time no sources deemed reliable appeared.

== WikiProjects and assessment ==
A WikiProject is a group of contributors who collaborate to improve Wikipedia. These groups may focus on a specific topic area (for example, women's history), a specific location or a specific kind of task (for example, checking newly created pages). As of August 2022, the English Wikipedia had over 2,000 WikiProjects, for which activity varied.

In 2007, in preparation for producing a print version, the English Wikipedia introduced an assessment scale of the quality of articles. Articles are rated by WikiProjects. The range of quality classes begins with "Stub" (very short pages), followed by "Start", "C" and "B" (in increasing order of quality). Community peer review is needed for the article to enter one of the quality classes: either "good article", "A", or the highest, "featured article". Of the about 6.5 million articles and lists assessed as of April 2022, more than 6,000 (0.09%) are featured articles, and fewer than 4,000 (0.06%) are featured lists. One featured article per day, as selected by editors, appears on the main page of Wikipedia.

Researcher Giacomo Poderi found that articles tend to reach featured status via the intensive work of a few editors. A 2010 study found unevenness in quality among featured articles and concluded that the community process is ineffective in assessing the quality of articles.

== Internal news publications ==
The Signpost icon, showing a styled 'S'

Community-produced news publications include The Signpost. Other community news publications have included the "WikiWorld" web comic, the Wikipedia Weekly podcast, and newsletters of specific WikiProjects like The Bugle from WikiProject Military History and the monthly newsletter from The Guild of Copy Editors. There are a number of publications from the Wikimedia Foundation and multilingual publications such as the Wikimedia Blog and This Month in Education.

== See also ==
- Protests against SOPA and PIPA § Wikimedia community
- Deletionpedia
