= Gender bias on Wikipedia =

Gender bias on Wikipedia is the overweighting of male perspectives and topics, resulting from the phenomenon that men are more likely than women to be volunteer contributors and be the subject of Wikipedia articles. As of June 2024, the English Wikipedia had almost 400,000 biographies of women, representing about 20% of total biographies. Wikipedia has no significant difference in readership, yet coverage of topics and individuals skews towards men.

As of 2024, 80% of active Wikipedia editors globally were male, 14% were female, 5% were gender diverse, and 4% chose not to state their gender.

In a 2018 survey covering 12 language versions of Wikipedia and some other Wikimedia Foundation projects, 90% of 3,734 respondents reported their gender as male, 8.8% as female, and 1% as other; among contributors to the English Wikipedia, 84.7% identified as male, 13.6% as female, and 1.7% as other (total of 88 respondents). In 2019, Katherine Maher, then CEO of Wikimedia Foundation, said her team's working assumption was that women made up 15–20% of total contributors.

A 2021 study found that, in April 2017, 41% of biographies nominated for deletion were women despite only 17% of published biographies being women. The visibility and reachability of women on Wikipedia is limited, with a 2015 report finding that female pages generally "tend to be more linked to men". Language that is considered sexist, loaded, or otherwise gendered has been identified in articles about women. Gender bias features among the most frequent criticisms of Wikipedia, sometimes as part of a more general criticism about systemic bias in Wikipedia.

In 2015, Wikipedia co-founder Jimmy Wales announced that the encyclopedia had failed to reach its goal to retain 25% female editorship. Programs such as edit-a-thons and Women in Red have been developed to encourage female editors and increase the coverage of women's topics.

== Gender bias in participation ==
=== Efforts to measure gender disparity ===
The first study of world-wide presence in 2008 found that 13% of all editors were female, which, after a follow-up study in 2011, was reduced to 9% globally. In the United States, a 2015 study found that 15% of contributors were women.

In 2009, a Wikimedia Foundation survey revealed that 6% of editors who made more than 500 edits were female, with the average male editor having twice as many edits.

Comparison of results for the proportion of Wikipedia readers and editors from the nationally representative Pew survey and the WMF/UNU-MERIT survey (UNU) for a series of dichotomous variables in both surveys. Adjusted numbers for editors assume that response bias for editors is identical to observed response bias for readers and, in the rightmost column, that bias is stable for editors outside the United States. Table reproduced from this source.
Variable	Readers US (Pew)	Readers US (UNU)	Editors US (UNU)	Editors US adj.	Editors (UNU)	Editors adj.
Female	49.0	39.9	17.8	22.7	12.7	16.1
Married	60.1	44.1	30.9	36.3	33.2	38.4
Children	36.0	29.4	16.4	27.6	14.4	25.3
Immigrant	10.1	14.4	12.1	9.8	8.2	7.4
Student	17.7	29.9	46.0	38.5	47.7	40.3

In 2010, United Nations University and UNU-MERIT jointly presented an overview of the results of a global Wikipedia survey. A New York Times article cited this Wikimedia Foundation collaboration, which indicated that fewer than 13% of contributors to Wikipedia are women. Sue Gardner, then executive director of the foundation, said that increasing diversity was about making the encyclopedia "as good as it could be". Factors the article cited as possibly discouraging women from editing included the "obsessive fact-loving realm", associations with the "hard-driving hacker crowd", and the necessity to be "open to very difficult, high-conflict people, even misogynists". In 2013, the results of the survey were adjusted for non-response bias by Hill and Shaw using a propensity score estimation technique to suggest upward corrections to the data from the survey and to recommend updates to the statistics being surveyed, giving 22.7% (17.8% unadjusted) for adult US female editors and 16.1% (12.7% unadjusted) for all US female editors.

In February 2011, The New York Times followed up with a series of opinions on the subject under the banner, "Where Are the Women in Wikipedia?" Susan C. Herring, a professor of information science and linguistics, said that she was not surprised by the Wikipedia contributors' gender gap. She said that the often contentious nature of Wikipedia article "talk" pages, where article content is discussed, is unappealing to many women, "if not outright intimidating". Joseph M. Reagle reacted similarly, saying that the combination of a "culture of hacker elitism", combined with the disproportionate effect of a minority of high-conflict members on the community atmosphere, can make it unappealing. He said, "the ideology and rhetoric of freedom and openness can then be used (a) to suppress concerns about inappropriate or offensive speech as 'censorship' and (b) to rationalize low female participation as simply a matter of their personal preference and choice." Justine Cassell said that although women are as knowledgeable as men, and as able to defend their point of view, "it is still the case in American society that debate, contention, and vigorous defense of one's position is often still seen as a male stance, and women's use of these speech styles can call forth negative evaluations."

In April 2011, the Wikimedia Foundation conducted its first semi-annual Wikipedia survey. It suggested that 9% of Wikipedia editors are women. It also reported, "Contrary to the perception of some, our data shows that very few women editors feel like they have been harassed, and very few feel Wikipedia is a sexualized environment." However, an October 2011 paper at the International Symposium on Wikis and Open Collaboration found evidence that suggested that Wikipedia may have "a culture that may be resistant to female participation."

A study published in 2014 found that there is also an "Internet skills gap" with regard to Wikipedia editors. The authors found that the most likely Wikipedia contributors are high-skilled men and that there is no gender gap among low-skilled editors, and concluded that the "skills gap" exacerbates the gender gap among editors. During 2010–14, women made up 61% of participants of the college courses arranged by the Wiki Education Foundation program that included editing Wikipedia as part of the curriculum. Their contributions were found to shift the Wikipedia content from pop-culture and STEM towards social sciences and humanities.

In 2015, Katherine Maher, Gardner's successor as the director of the Wikimedia Foundation, argued that Wikipedia's gender bias "reflects society as a whole". For example, she noted that Wikipedia is dependent on secondary sources which have similar biases. She agreed that Wikipedia's editing process introduces biases of its own, especially as topics that are popular among its predominantly male editors draw more edits.

A 2017 study found that women participating in an experiment by editing a Wikipedia-like site tended to view other editors as male, and to view their responses as more critical than if the other editor was gender-neutral. The study concluded that:

...visible female editors on Wikipedia and broader encouragement of the use of constructive feedback may begin to alleviate the Wikipedia gender gap. Furthermore, the relatively high proportion of anonymous editors may exacerbate the Wikipedia gender gap, as anonymity may often be perceived as male and more critical.

A 2017 study by Heather Ford and Judy Wajcman observes that research on the gender bias continues to frame the problem as a deficit in women. In contrast, their central argument states that infrastructure studies in feminist technoscience allows the gender analysis to be taken to a further level. It looks at three issues within the infrastructure: content policies, software, and the legalistic framework of operation. It suggests that progress can be made through altering that culture of knowledge production through encouraging alternate knowledge, reducing the technical barriers to editing, and addressing the complexity of Wikipedia policies.

In their February 2018 article, "Pipeline of Online Participation Inequalities: The Case of Wikipedia Editing", Shaw and Hargittai concluded from their studies that solving the problems of participation inequality including gender bias requires a broader focus on subjects other than inequality. They recommended a focus on encouraging participants of all educational backgrounds, skill levels, and age groups to help Wikipedia to improve. They recommended further that informing more women that Wikipedia is free to edit and open to everyone is critical in eliminating gender bias.

In March 2018, mathematician Marie A. Vitulli wrote in Notices of the American Mathematical Society, "The percentage of women editors on Wikipedia remains dismally low."

In 2014, Noopur Raval, a PhD candidate at UC Irvine, wrote in "The Encyclopedia Must Fail!– Notes on Queering Wikipedia" that "making a platform open access does not automatically translate to equality of participation, ease of access, or cultural acceptance of the medium." In 2017, researchers Matthew A. Vetter and Keon Mandell Pettiway said that the white, cis-gendered male dominance among Wikipedia editors has led to the "erasure of non-normative gender and sexual identities", in addition to cis-gendered females, and that the "androcentric and heteronormative discourses" of Wikipedia editing insufficiently allow "marginalized gender and sexual identities to take part in language use and the construction of knowledge."

=== Causes ===
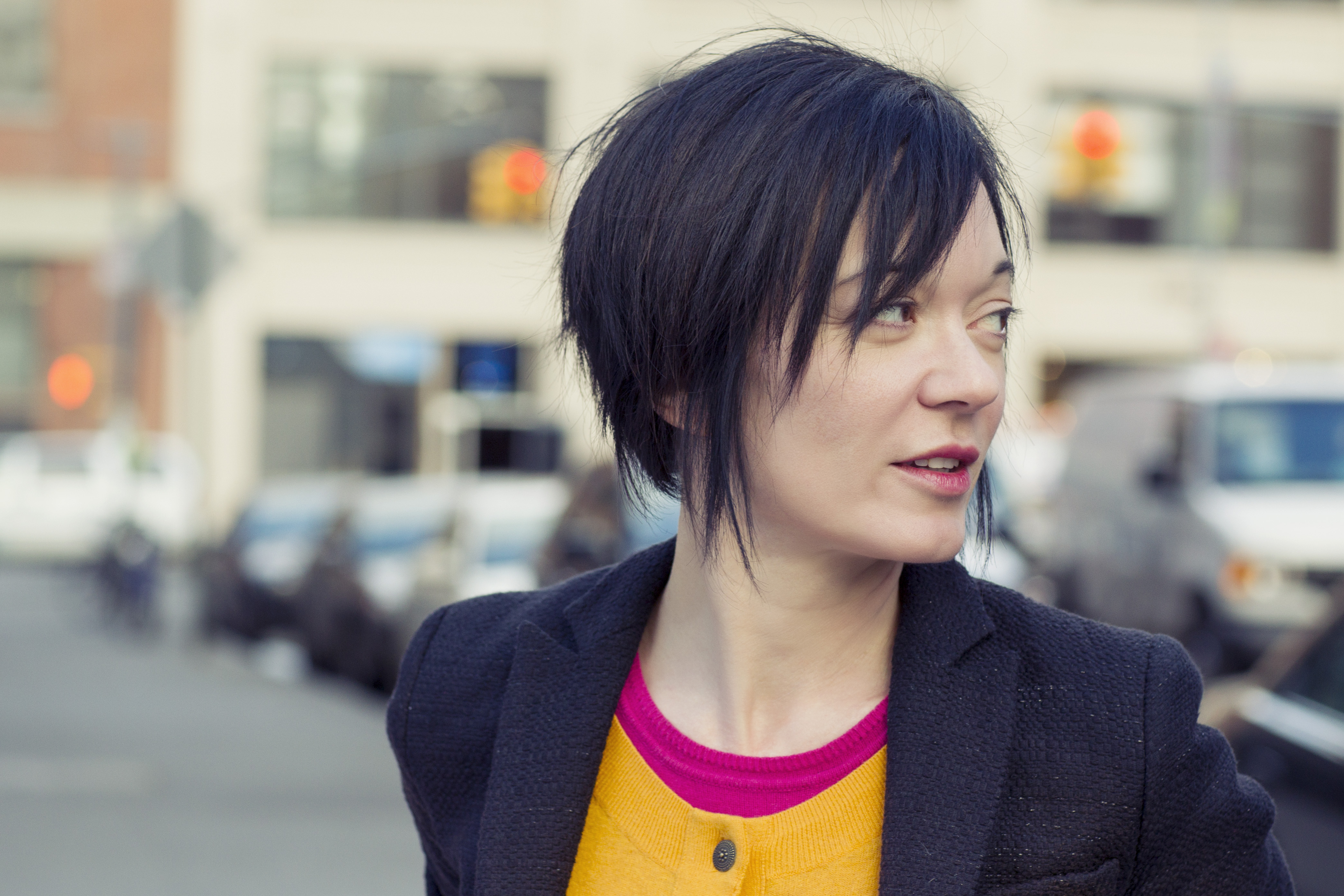
Former Wikimedia Foundation executive director Sue Gardner reported nine reasons, offered by female Wikipedia editors, in an essay on the lack of female editors on Wikipedia.

Collier and Bear's research suggests that the difference in contribution rates could be due to three factors: (1) the high levels of conflict in discussions, (2) dislike of critical environments, and (3) lack of confidence in editing other contributors' work. A published scoping review on the gender gap in Wikipedia found three main categories for these factors in academic literature: 'women problem' (blaming female characteristics), 'mirror effect' (blaming society but excusing Wikipedia), and 'systemic problem' (blaming the original male-dominated editor community).

The New York Times pointed out that Wikipedia's female participation rate may be in line with other "public thought-leadership forums". A 2010 study revealed a Wikipedia female participation rate of 13 percent, observed to be close to the 15 percent overall female participation rate of other "public thought-leadership forums". Wikipedia research fellow Sarah Stierch acknowledged that it is "fairly common" for Wikipedia contributors to remain gender-anonymous. A perceived unwelcoming culture and tolerance of violent and abusive language are also reasons put forth for the gender gap. According to a 2013 study, another cause of the gender gap in Wikipedia is the failure to attract and retain female editors, resulting in a negative impact on Wikipedia's coverage. As well, Wikipedia "...editors that publicly identify as women face harassment" from other Wikipedia editors.

Former Wikimedia Foundation executive director Sue Gardner cited nine reasons why women do not edit Wikipedia, culled from comments by female Wikipedia editors:

1. A lack of user-friendliness in the editing interface.
2. Not having enough free time.
3. A lack of self-confidence.
4. Aversion to conflict and an unwillingness to participate in lengthy edit wars.
5. Belief that their contributions are too likely to be reverted or deleted.
6. Some find its overall atmosphere misogynistic.
7. Wikipedia culture is sexual in ways they find off-putting.
8. Being addressed as male is off-putting to women whose primary language has grammatical gender.
9. Fewer opportunities for social relationships and a welcoming tone compared to other sites.

Though the proportion of female readership to male readership on Wikipedia is roughly equal (47%), women are less likely to convert themselves to editors (16%). Several studies suggest that there may be a formed culture in Wikipedia that discourages women from participating. Lam et al. link this culture to a disparity in male-to-female centric topics represented and edited, the tendency for female users to be more active in the social and community aspects of Wikipedia, an increased likelihood that edits by new female editors are reverted, and/or that articles with high proportions of female editors are more contentious.

The issue has also been connected with broader societal views on what records and information should be. Since Wikipedia has an expectation of "professionalism", authors Joan Schwartz and Terry Cook say that the standards of the professional are often created by the standards of what dominant political groups find comfortable, and affect women and people of color much more than they do men. Disputes about institutional power are often worth discussing when determining whether a submission should be disputed or not.

In 2019, Schlomit Aharoni Lir described "the vicious circle" model, displaying how the five layers of negative reputation, anonymity, fear, alienation and rejection – enhance each other, in a manner that deters women from contributing to the website. In order for more women to join Wikipedia, the researcher offers the implantation of a "Virtuous Circle" that consists of nonymity, connection to social media, inclusionist policy, soft deletion and red-flagging harassments.

In Wikimedia's Gender Equity Report in 2018, 14% of interviewees identified poor community health (Note: A term meaning the opposite of community well-being, with respect to the Wikipedia online community.) as a significant challenge in being an editor on Wikipedia. In the study, community health was defined as harassment, a general lack of support for gender equity work and a lack of diversity in leadership.

After reviewing testimonies that ranged from microaggressions to direct attacks, the Wikipedia Board of Trustees voted in May 2020 to adopt a more formal moderation process to fight against harassment and to uphold Wikipedia's community standards. The foundation has been tasked to finish the draft of this plan by the end of 2020, and it will include banning users who participate in gender harassment, providing support and communities for all gender identities, putting more resources into the Trust and Safety Team, and more.

Collier and Bear in 2012 summarized the reason for working barriers of women in Wikipedia in three words: conflict, criticism and confidence. The authors suggested that "If a community tolerates a culture of conflict that males perceived to be simply 'competitive' or witty and sarcastic they are likely to find themselves losing the many benefits female contributors can bring to the table". Criticism refers to women's unwillingness to edit someone else's work and to let their work be edited by someone else; confidence shows that women are often not too confident about their own expertise and ability in editing and contributing to a certain work. Wikipedia's free to edit policy gives users an open platform, but researchers have suggested that its competitive and critical environment can limit women's incentives to participate.

Through examining the power infrastructure of Wikipedia, Ford and Wajcman pointed out another cause that may reinforce Wikipedia's gender bias. Editing on Wikipedia requires "particular forms of sociotechnical expertise and authority that constitute the knowledge or epistemological infrastructure of Wikipedia". People who are equipped with this expertise and skill are considered more likely to reach positions with power in Wikipedia. These are proposed to be predominantly men. Further, in examining Wikipedia's detailed policy system, the researchers conclude that its complexity and legal underpinnings grant some users substantial influence in content debates. This dominance can marginalize those not versed in these details, particularly deterring women and new participants.

Studies have also considered the gender bias in Wikipedia from a historical perspective. Konieczny and Klein indicated that Wikipedia is just a part of our biased society which has a long history of gender inequality. As Wikipedia records daily activities by individual editors, it serves as both "a reflection of the world" and "a tool used to produce our world".

An example of a direct account of gender bias comes from Wikipedia user Lightbreather, where she recounts having pornographic images linked to her username as a way to discredit her Wikipedia contributions.

Harassment, however, also exists for LGBT people. Those who identify as being part of the community are typically subjected to harassment if their identities are made public. For example, an administrator on a Wikipedia page blocked an editor, merely because the person's username implied they were a part of the LGBT community.

== Gender bias in content ==
In 2016, Wagner et al. found that gender inequality manifests itself in Wikipedia's biographical content in multiple ways, including unequal thresholds for including an article on the person, topical bias, linguistic bias, and structural inequalities. The authors found that women with biographies on Wikipedia are slightly more notable than men on Wikipedia, and proposed three possible explanations for future research: 1) that editors are more likely to write about their own gender, 2) that men are more likely to create articles about themselves, and 3) that external sources make women less visible. As for topical bias, biographies about women tend to focus more on family-, gender-, and relationship-related topics. This is especially true for biographies of women born before 1900. The authors also found structural differences in terms of meta-data and hyperlinks, which have consequences for information-seeking activities.

=== Article creation and deletion ===
Of the 1,960,452 biographical articles on the English Wikipedia in September 2023, only 385,236 or 19.65% were about women.

In July 2006, Stacy Schiff wrote a New Yorker essay about Wikipedia entitled "Know It All". The Wikipedia article about her was created the very same day. According to Timothy Noah, she was apparently not notable by Wikipedia standards, despite winning the Guggenheim fellowship and Pulitzer Prize many years prior. Her essay and the article about her are now featured in the WikiProject to counter systemic bias.

In the English Wikipedia and five other language editions that were studied by researchers, the ratio of articles about women to articles about men was higher than in three other databases. However, analysis with computational linguistics concluded that the way women and men are described in articles demonstrates bias, with articles about women more likely to use more words relating to gender and family. The researchers believe that this is a sign Wikipedia editors consider male the "null gender" (in other words, that "male" is assumed unless otherwise specified, an example of male as norm). Another critique of Wikipedia's approach, from a 2014 Guardian editorial, is that it has difficulty making judgments about "what matters". To illustrate this point, they noted that the page listing pornographic actresses was better organized than the page listing women writers.

The International Journal of Communication published research by Reagle and Lauren Rhue that examined the coverage, gender representation, and article length of thousands of biographical subjects on the English-language Wikipedia and the online Encyclopædia Britannica (as of June 2010). They concluded that Wikipedia provided better coverage and longer articles in general, that Wikipedia typically has more articles on women than Britannica in absolute terms, but Wikipedia articles on women were more likely to be missing than articles on men relative to Britannica. That is, Wikipedia dominated Britannica in biographical coverage, but more so when it comes to men. Similarly, one might say that Britannica is more balanced in whom it neglects to cover than Wikipedia. For both reference works, article length did not consistently differ by gender. A 2023 study using Wikidata to measure content found that Britannica, which covers 50,479 biographies, has 5,999 of them about women, about 11.88%. The study compared the figure to the 18.22% of biographies across Wikimedia projects that were of women, citing 2021 data. A 2011 study by researchers from the University of Minnesota and three other universities found that articles edited by women, "which presumably were more likely to be of interest to women", were "significantly shorter" on average than those worked on by men or by both men and women.

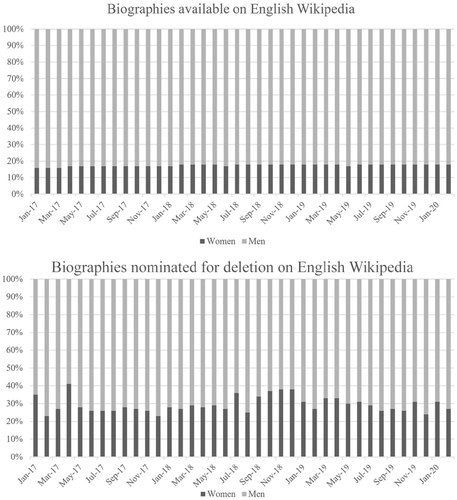
A side-by-side comparison of the portion of available biographies about women on Wikipedia versus the portion of women biographies nominated for deletion from January 2017 to February 2020, Francesca Tripodi

In October 2018, when Donna Strickland won a Nobel Prize in Physics, numerous write-ups mentioned that she did not previously have a Wikipedia page. A draft had been submitted, but was rejected for not demonstrating "significant coverage (not just passing mentions) about the subject". According to a 2021 study by sociologist Francesca Tripodi, biographies on Wikipedia about women are disproportionately nominated for deletion as non-notable. A 2024 study by Khandaker Tasnim Huq and Giovanni Luca Ciampaglia on English speaking Wikipedia additionally showed that deletion nominations happen 34% faster after the creation of women biographies than after the creation of men biographies.

=== Article visibility ===
A 2016 study led by Claudia Wagner showed that biographies of women on Wikipedia in English are less visible than biographies of men and concluded that this difference is partly due to the fact that the community links articles about men better together. In 2023, a study conducted by Akhil Arora, Robert West and Martin Gerlach showed that biographies of women are over-represented among orphan articles (articles that cannot be accessed via other articles): in English Wikipedia, women represent 19% of the biographies, but also represent 29% of orphan biographies. Furthermore, the study shows that orphan articles are less visible than the others.

=== Article content ===
While most attention falls on the gap between biographies of men and women on Wikipedia, some research also focuses on linguistics and differences in topics covered. In 2020, the Association for Computational Linguistics performed a textual analysis of gender biases within Wikipedia articles. The study found that articles about women contain more gender-specific phrases such as "female scientist" while men are referenced using more gender-neutral terms such as "scientist". The study concluded that overall gender bias is decreasing for science and family oriented articles, while increasing for artistic and creative content.

A 2015 study found that, on the English Wikipedia, the word "divorced" appears more than four times as often in biographical articles about women than men. According to the Wikimedia Foundation, "We don't fully know why, but it's likely a multitude of factors, including the widespread tendency throughout history to describe the lives of women through their relationships with men".

A 2020 study of the coverage of Fortune 1000 CEOs found a gender bias in favour of women. The study investigated contributions from brand-new versus more established editors and found that new editors are more likely to introduce information biased against women, but that established users tend to overcompensate when reacting to these edits. Articles written by a more diverse group of new and established editors were found to be most neutral.

Transgender and non-binary people also experience gender bias harassment on Wikipedia. For example, when celebrities come out as transgender, they are commonly subjected to discrimination and their pronouns are then put up for debate. Notable examples of these debates include Chelsea Manning in 2013 and Caitlyn Jenner in 2015, when their self-declared pronouns were vandalized and reverted to their previous pronouns. A 2021 study found that articles about transgender women and non-binary people tend to have a higher percentage of their article devoted to the "Personal Life" section, which often focuses on the person's gender identity: "The implication that gender identity is a noteworthy trait for just these groups is possibly indicative of 'othering', where individuals are distinguished or labeled as not fitting a societal norm, which often occurs in the context of gender or sexual orientation".

In 2022 study, it was found that scholarly articles by men are more likely to be cited than those by women. Furthermore, publications with women as the main authors are significantly less likely to be referenced on Wikipedia. An explanation for this offered by the authors is homophily, which is the idea that people prefer other people or work similar to their own. This may explain the citation bias as Wikipedia editors are mainly male, so they may prefer publications by men.

== Reactions ==
Wikipedia has been criticized by some academics and journalists for having primarily male contributors, and for having fewer and less extensive articles about women or topics important to women.

Writing for Slate in 2011, conservative political commentator Heather Mac Donald called Wikipedia's gender imbalance a "non-problem in search of a misguided solution". Mac Donald asserted, "The most straightforward explanation for the differing rates of participation in Wikipedia—and the one that conforms to everyday experience—is that, on average, males and females have different interests and preferred ways of spending their free time".

In 2013, Sue Gardner, the executive director of the Wikimedia Foundation at the time, said of the gender gap, "I didn't solve it. We didn't solve it. The Wikimedia Foundation didn't solve it. The solution won't come from the Wikimedia Foundation."

In August 2014, Wikipedia co-founder Jimmy Wales announced in a BBC interview the Wikimedia Foundation's plans for "doubling down" on the gender content gap at Wikipedia. Wales said the Foundation would be open to more outreach and more software changes.

In Invisible Women: Exposing Data Bias in a World Designed for Men, Caroline Criado Perez notes that many Wikipedia pages that refer to men's teams or occupations are listed as gender neutral (England national football team), while pages for similar teams or occupations for women are specifically gendered (England women's national football team).

In 2022, Wikipedia was seen as "reflecting the biases of its community editors."

In 2025, Núria Ferran-Ferrer, Associate Professor and Rector's Delegate for the Direction of the Equality Unit of Universitat de Barcelona (UB), called gender bias on Wikipedia is "systemic" and "over a decade", combining research to explain why such bias happened. Ferran-Ferrer proposed some effects to address the issue: more female editors, contributors' general diversity, better coverage of women in mainstream media, more accessible editorial guidelines, and a welcoming and encouraging culture for new editors.

== Efforts to address gender bias ==
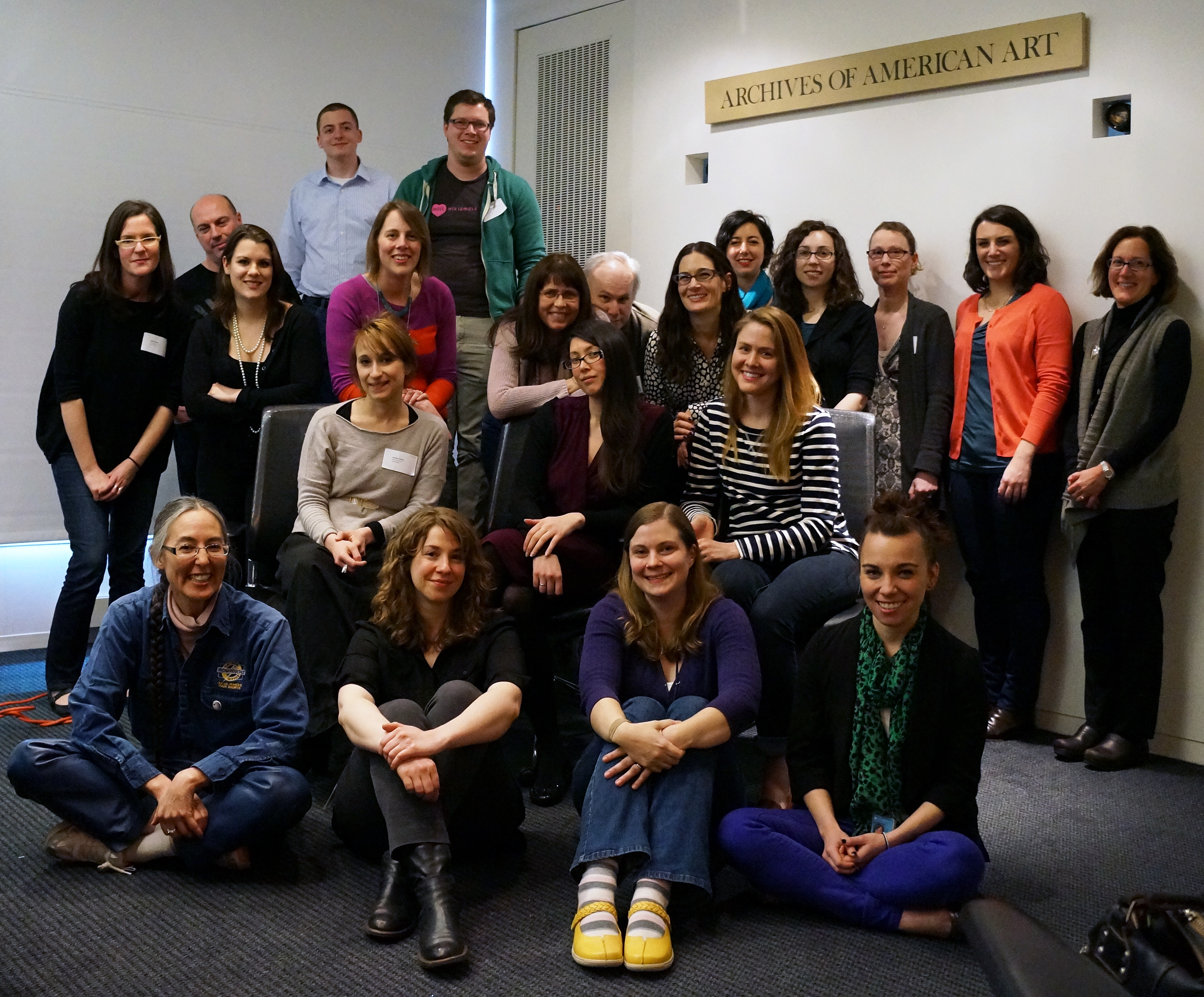
Attendees at the 2013 Women in the Arts edit-a-thon in Washington, D.C.

=== Wikimedia Foundation ===
The Wikimedia Foundation has officially held the stance, since at least 2011 when Gardner was executive director, that gender bias exists in the project. It has made some attempts to address it but Gardner has expressed frustration with the degree of success achieved. She has also noted that "in the very limited leisure time women had, they tended to be more involved in social activities instead of editing Wikipedia. 'Women see technology more as a tool they use to accomplish tasks, rather than something fun in itself.'" In 2011, the Foundation set a target of having 25 percent of its contributors identifying as female by 2015. In August 2013, Gardner said, "I didn't solve it. We didn't solve it. The Wikimedia Foundation didn't solve it. The solution won't come from the Wikimedia Foundation."

In 2017, Wikimedia Foundation put a funding of $500,000 in building a more encouraging environment for diversity on Wikipedia.

VisualEditor, a project funded by the Wikimedia Foundation that allows for WYSIWYG-style editing on Wikipedia, is said to be aimed in part at closing the gender gap.

Thanks to a Wikimedia Foundation grant, in March 2021 an alpha version of Humaniki was released, providing a wide variety of gender gap statistics based on Wikidata. The statistics are automatically updated as new information is made available.

In 2024, Wikimedia Research Fund funded a one-year project called "Cover Women". It analyses how women and marginalized groups are shown on Wikipedia's main page.

A number of individuals, particularly women in academia, have been creating articles of female scientists. As of 2026, female biologists in academic institutions in the US are now more likely to have a Wikipedia page than their male counterparts.

=== User-led efforts ===
Dedicated edit-a-thons have been organized to increase the coverage of women's topics in Wikipedia and to encourage more women to edit Wikipedia. These events are supported by the Wikimedia Foundation, which sometimes provides mentors and technology to help guide newer editors through the process. A few examples of edit-a-thons focused on specific topics included Australian female neuroscientists and women in Jewish history.

An early-2015 initiative to create a "women-only" space for Wikipedia editors was strongly opposed by Wikipedians.

Some users have tried to combat this male-dominated space by creating support groups for female Wikipedia users, one being the WikiWomen's User Group. This group is used not only to promote women editing and contributing on more pages, but to also add more pages about women who contribute to society at large.

The Wikipedia Teahouse project was launched with the goal to provide a user-friendly environment for newcomers, with a particular goal of boosting women's participation in Wikipedia.

In the summer of 2015, the WikiProject Women in Red was launched on the English-language version of Wikipedia, focusing on the creation of new articles about notable women. Mainly through its monthly virtual editathons, Women in Red encourages editors to participate in extending Wikipedia's coverage. Thanks in part to the efforts of this project, by June 2018 some 17,000 new women's biographies had been added to Wikipedia.

Many Wikiprojects are committed to promoting editors' contribution on gender and women studies, which include "WikiProject women, WikiProject feminism, WikiProject gender studies, and the WikiProject countering systemic bias/gender gap task force".

Expanding beyond the male/female gender binary, Wikiproject LGBT creates a space for "re/writing the inclusion and representation of LGBTQ culture into Wikipedia mainspace".

In 2018, one edit-a-thon organizer named Sarah Osborne Bender explained to The Guardian how men remove Wikipedia pages about women leaders. "I wrote a Wikipedia article about a woman gallerist and the next day, I got a message saying it was deleted because she is not a 'noteworthy person', but someone in our community gave me advice on how to edit it to make the page stay".

A May 2026 publication featured in the Proceedings of the Royal Society reported that, amongst a census of female and male tenure-track biologists affiliated with the respective departments of all US R1 universities, women were "significantly less likely to be featured on the platform than their male peers until 2018", but the trend reversed in 2022, and "women were 25% more likely than men to have a Wikipedia biography in 2024". In addition, the biographies of women in the census tended to be longer than those of men. The authors of the publication noted that "among the 163 women’s biographies created since 2015, 78 were created by Wikipedia editors that were affiliated with the Women in Red project, 16 were created by editors affiliated with the Women Scientists project (however, 14 of these were created by individuals that were also part of the Women in Red project), and 13 were created by users registered as students enrolled in university courses that require/encourage contributing to Wikipedia."

An August 2026 publication focused on the coverage of German scholars on the German Wikipedia and found that female professors seemingly had "a higher chance of having a Wikipedia biography than their male counterparts", with the effect being concentrated in STEM disciplines. The authors also noted that "extended professional networks could also have a direct impact on Wikipedia biographies, as they increase the likelihood of being portrayed as part of Wikipedia editing campaigns", while noting that female professors could benefit from initiatives committed to write biographies about women on Wikipedia, including the FemNetz and WomenEdit projects in Berlin, as well as the "Who writes his_tory?" group in Switzerland.

=== Jess Wade ===
In 2022, an article in VICE magazine detailed how Jessica Wade has created more than 1,700 Wikipedia entries on women scientists since 2017 for many women whose contributions have gone unnoticed.

Wade has made a large contribution to a Wikipedia campaign that encourages the creation of Wikipedia articles about notable female academics, in order to promote female role models in STEM. Wade has created new Wikipedia biographical articles to raise the profile of women in STEM. As of February 2020, she had written over 900 biographies on Wikipedia. By January 2021, this figure had risen to 1,200. By February 2024, it was over 2,100.

On 12 April 2019, The Washington Post published an op-ed titled "The black hole photo is just one example of championing women in science", co-authored by Zaringhalam and Wade, advocating for increased recognition for women who contribute to science. After the first image of a black hole was released, media coverage celebrated Katie Bouman's role leading the creation of the image processing algorithm. The op-ed emphasized the power of social media like Twitter and collaborative information repositories like Wikipedia for crediting women's scientific contributions.

As an example of insufficient coverage in the English-language Wikipedia of women in science, the article points to the deletion of the biography of Clarice Phelps. Wade created a short Wikipedia biography of Phelps in September 2018. The deletion of that article on 11 February 2019 led to a prolonged editorial discussion and its repeated restoration and re-deletion. Katrina Krämer wrote in Chemistry World:

In Phelps' case, her name didn't appear in the articles announcing tennessine's discovery. She wasn't profiled by mainstream media. Most mentions of her work are on her employer's website – a source that's not classed as independent by Wikipedia standards and therefore not admissible when it comes to establishing notability. The [Wikipedia] community consensus was that her biography had to go.

Wade told Chemistry World she believes such omissions of scientific researchers from coverage in Wikipedia are regrettable, stating her impression that it accepts entries for even the most obscure popular-media figures. By January 2020, there was a consensus to restore the article, as by then new sources had become available. As of 2019, of the 600 articles about female scientists Wade had written, 6 had been deleted for not meeting Wikipedia's criteria for notability.

=== Third parties ===
In 2013, FemTechNet launched "Wikistorming" as a project that offers feminist scholarship and encourages Wikipedia editing as part of school and college teaching.

In July 2014, the National Science Foundation announced that it would spend $200,000 to study systemic gender bias on Wikipedia.

In 2015, Jennifer C. Edwards, the history department chairperson at Manhattan College, explained that educational institutions can use Wikipedia assignments such as encyclopedia's gender gap analysis and coverage of female topics to inspire students to alter the current gender imbalance.

In 2022, Angela Fan, a researcher at Meta Platforms, announced an open-source software artificial intelligence model that will be able to create Wikipedia-style biographical rough drafts that "will one day help Wikipedia editors create many thousands of accurate, compelling biography entries for important people who are currently not on the site", including women.

== See also ==
- Racial bias on Wikipedia
- Geographical bias on Wikipedia
- Second-generation gender bias
- Systemic bias in Wikipedia
