= WikiProject =

Affinity group of wiki participants

A group icon associated with WikiProjects

A WikiProject is an affinity group for contributors with shared goals within the Wikimedia movement. WikiProjects are prevalent within the largest wiki, Wikipedia, and exist to varying degrees within sibling projects such as Wiktionary, Wikiquote, Wikidata, and Wikisource. They also exist in different languages, and translating articles is a form of collaboration among them.

During the COVID-19 pandemic, CBS News noted the role of Wikipedia's WikiProject Medicine in maintaining the accuracy of articles related to the disease. Another WikiProject that has drawn attention is WikiProject Women Scientists. Smithsonian profiled the project for its efforts to improve coverage of women scientists. The profile noted had "helped increase the number of female scientists on Wikipedia from around 1,600 to over 5,000".

== On Wikipedia ==
Some Wikipedia WikiProjects are substantial enough to engage in cooperative activities with outside organizations relevant to the field at issue.

Wikipedia has thousands of WikiProjects, primarily organized by topic and responsible for specific maintenance tasks. One task commonly performed by topical WikiProjects on Wikipedia is the assessment of the quality of articles that fall within that topic area. In Wikipedia and sibling projects, WikiProject pages are located in project space, and the meta information regarding the association between the article and the WikiProject is usually included on the talk page of the article.

WikiProjects provide an additional avenue for engagement among editors with similar interests and have been found to increase their productivity. In order to spur participation and concentrate effectiveness, WikiProjects on Wikipedia may engage in activities like having a "collaboration of the week", or designating one article to be improved to the point of achieving "featured" status. The WikiProject Council is a group of editors that assists with the development of active WikiProjects and acts as a central point for inter-WikiProject discussion and collaboration.

A 2008 academic study of Wikipedia concluded that participation in WikiProjects substantially improved the chances of an editor becoming an administrator, finding that one Wikipedia policy edit or WikiProject edit is worth ten article edits, and concluding:

Merely performing a large amount of production work is insufficient for "promotion" on Wikipedia. Candidates' article edits were weak predictors of success. They also have to demonstrate more managerial behavior. Diverse experience and contributions to the development of policies and WikiProjects were stronger predictors of RfA success. This is consistent with the findings that Wikipedia is a bureaucracy and that coordination work has increased substantially. [...] Participation in Wikipedia policy and WikiProjects was not predictive of adminship prior to 2006, suggesting the community as a whole is beginning to prioritize policymaking and organization experience over simple article-level coordination.

=== WikiProjects and assessments of article importance and quality ===
In 2007, the English Wikipedia introduced an assessment scale for article quality. Articles are rated by WikiProjects. The range of quality classes begins with "Stub" (very short pages), followed by "Start", "C" and "B" (in increasing order of quality). Community peer review is needed for the article to enter one of the highest-quality classes: either "A", "good article", or the highest, "featured article". Of the about 4.4 million articles and lists assessed as of March 2015, about 7,000 (0.16%) are a featured article or a featured list. One featured article per day, as selected by editors, appears on the main page of Wikipedia. According to research in 2021, WikiProject Tropical Cyclones has the most quality content in terms of good articles and featured articles. This is unusual, due to the project's narrow scope and member count of only around 100.

The articles can also be rated for importance by WikiProjects. Currently, there are five importance categories: "low", "mid", "high", "top", and "???" for unclassified/unsure level. For a particular article, different WikiProjects may assign different importance levels.

The Wikipedia Version 1.0 Editorial Team has developed a table (shown below) that displays data on all rated articles by quality and importance on the English Wikipedia. If an article or list receives different ratings by two or more WikiProjects, then the highest rating is used in the table and bar chart.

Researcher Giacomo Poderi found that articles tend to reach featured status via the intensive work of a few editors. A 2010 study found unevenness in quality among featured articles and concluded that the community process is ineffective in assessing the quality of articles.

All articles by quality and importance
Quality	Importance					
Quality	Top	High	Mid	Low	???	Total
FA	1,676	2,689	2,512	2,190	194	9,261
FL	196	706	792	725	86	2,505
A	381	702	813	619	110	2,625
GA	3,569	8,152	16,503	23,368	1,951	53,543
B	18,470	36,494	61,475	89,434	29,126	234,999
C	18,483	60,165	153,817	390,239	112,404	735,108
Start	18,818	96,648	442,168	1,887,065	459,642	2,904,341
Stub	3,936	30,272	273,941	2,923,670	793,256	4,025,075
List	5,331	18,802	58,327	229,742	102,186	414,388
Assessed	70,860	254,630	1,010,348	5,547,052	1,498,955	8,381,845
Unassessed	105	355	867	10,291	310,424	322,042
Total	70,965	254,985	1,011,215	5,557,343	1,809,379	8,703,887

Articles in this table may be listed in multiple projects. The counts, especially the total article count, is not a count of the total number of articles in English Wikipedia.

- Featured articles
- Featured lists
- A-class articles
- Good articles
- B-class articles
- C-class articles
- Start-class articles
- Stub articles
- Lists
- Unassessed articles and lists

== Notable WikiProjects ==
=== WikiProject AI Cleanup ===
The AI Cleanup WikiProject was formed in 2023 to address the "surge of faulty AI-generated writing" and remove AI slop content from the site. The project finds AI-generated content by checking for phrases commonly used by large language models such as ChatGPT, and tracks the use of AI-generated images in articles. It also maintains a guide for helping editors to spot AI-generated content, including a list of characteristics that chatbot-written articles typically exhibit.

=== WikiProjects Israel and Palestine ===
In September 2006, the Israel WikiProject was established to improve coverage of Israel-related topics. The Palestine WikiProject was created two months later. In 2008, the Israel Palestine Collaboration WikiProject was set up to reconcile editing efforts related to the Israeli–Palestinian conflict, with the project's page reading: "In a subject plagued by conflicting historical narratives, we are working to make Wikipedia the conflict's most balanced reference point. Help us build bridges and break down barriers in the world's most intractable conflict."

=== WikiProject Medicine ===
The Medicine WikiProject was formed in 2004 to improve coverage of medicine-related topics.

A 2011 review of the project's efforts praised it for assessing most medical articles on Wikipedia (at that time about 25,000), at the same time remarking that only around 70 have been assessed as high quality. The first use of Wikipedia medical content in formal medical education was in 2011. A 2014 study found that the frequency of Wikipedia medical topics referenced in medical publications has increased over time since 2010, in spite of recommendations discouraging doctors from using Wikipedia, with the majority provided as definitions or descriptions.

A 2016 review written by Wikipedians (Note: "Competing interests: All authors have contributed to Wikipedia articles. TS, DD, MH and JH are current participants in WP:MED. JH is a former and current member of the Wikimedia Foundation board of trustees. All authors are on the editorial board of WikiJournal of Medicine. TS is on the editorial board of PLOS Genetics.") stated that the number of high quality articles had improved to about 80. The review praised the efforts of the volunteers, but said that participation levels are too low to promise any significant improvements in the thousands of lower-quality articles, calling for more medical practitioners to volunteer. (Note: The article processing fee was covered by a rapid grant from the Wikimedia Foundation. The Foundation had no involvement in the study design, the collection, analysis and interpretation of the data, writing the report, or in the decision to submit the manuscript for publication.) The review also said that readability (complexity) of Wikipedia articles may be too high for its intended audience, and encouraged the Wikipedia volunteers to review this aspect.

CBS News described the role of WikiProject Medicine in content about the COVID-19 pandemic, stating that while "hot topics that get a lot of page views are carefully edited, inaccurate information persists on some of Wikipedia's less-read pages". James Heilman told CBS News, "I do not recommend people trust Wikipedia blindly. I think doing so would be silly. Yet, you know, people shouldn't trust other sources of information blindly, either."

According to a review written by a Wikipedia contributor and advocate, (Note: The author is a Wikipedia contributor and advocates for Wikipedia authorship to health workers, students, and faculty at McMaster University.") (Note: "The Author declared in the cover letter being awarded a grant from the Wikimedia Foundation whose funding would cover this publication if accepted. Financial Disclosure section and Competing Interests section should be updated accordingly (in competing interests, I believe Author could specify having obtained the grant -after- completing and submitting this work)".) as of 2020, Wikipedia is among the world's most accessed resources for health information by the public, patients, students, and practitioners. More recently (in 2023), WikiProject Medicine has been studied as an example of medical volunteerism.

=== WikiProject Women in Red ===
Women in Red is a WikiProject intended to address gender bias in Wikipedia content. The project focuses on creating content regarding women's biographies, women's works, and women's issues. Women in Red was established in July 2015, at Wikimania Mexico City, by Roger Bamkin and Rosie Stephenson-Goodknight.
