= Rosemary (given name) =

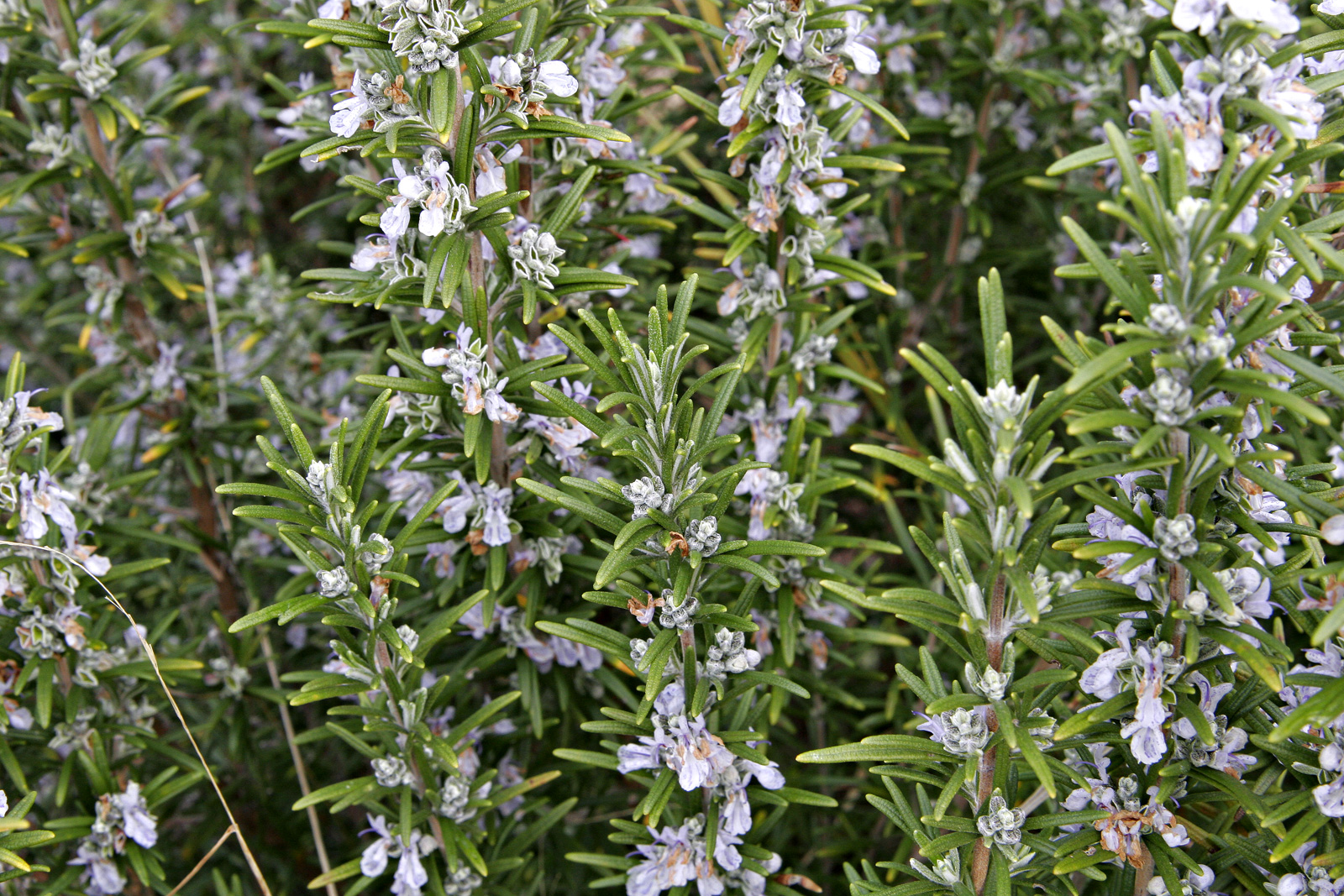
- Rosemary flowers
- Gender: female

Origin
- Origin: Combination of Rose and Mary or the plant named rosemary.
- Region of origin: English speaking countries

Other names
- Related names: Rose, Mary, Rosie, Rosemarie, Romy Rie

Rosemary is a feminine given name, a combination of the names Rose which is a flower that belongs to the Rose family, and from the name Mary which is the name of the Virgin Mary and means Strong, Fertile. It can also be used in reference to the herb named rosemary. Rosemary has been in steady use in the United States and has ranked among the top 1,000 for 110 years. It was ranked as the 754th most popular name for American girls born in 1992. Its greatest period of popularity in the United States was between 1925 and 1950, when it was ranked among the top 150 names for girls. Rosemarie is another variant, and Romy is a German nickname for the name.

== Notable people ==
- Rosemary A. Bailey (born 1947), British statistician
- Rosemary A. Stevens (born 1935), historian of American medicine and health policy
- Rosemary Aitken (born 1942), English author
- Rosemary Altea (born 1946), British author
- Rosemary Anne Sisson (1923–2017), English television dramatist and novelist
- Rosemary Ashe (born 1953), English stage actress and classically trained opera singer
- Rosemary Ashton (born 1947), British literary scholar
- Rosemary Askin (born 1949), New Zealand geologist
- Rosemary Aubert (born 1946), Canadian-American author, poet, and critic
- Rosemary Bailey (author) (born 1953), British writer
- Rosemary Banks (born 1951), former New Zealand diplomat
- Rosemary Barkett (born 1939), Judge of the Iran–United States Claims Tribunal
- Rosemary Barnett, British sculptor
- Rosemary Barrow (1968–2016), art historian
- Rosemary Barton (born 1976), Canadian political journalist
- Rosemary Beresford, American figure skater
- Rosemary Betterton (born 1951), English feminist art historian and professor
- Rosemary Biggs (1912–2001), English haematologist
- Rosemary Blight, Australian film producer
- Rosemary Brown (disambiguation), various people
- Rosemary Bryant Mariner (1953–2019), American female military aviator
- Rosemary Butler, American singer
- Rosemary Butler (politician) (born 1943), British politician
- Rosemary Byrne (born 1948), Scottish politician and co-convenor of Solidarity
- Rosemary Campbell (born 1944), New Zealand painter
- Rosemary Candlin (born 1927), computer scientist
- Rosemary Carter, writer
- Rosemary Casals (born 1948), former American professional tennis player
- Rosemary Catacalos, 2013 poet laureate of Texas
- Rosemary Church (born 1962), British journalist
- Rosemary Clement-Moore, American author
- Rosemary Clooney (1928–2002), American singer
- Rosemary Coldstream, New Zealand-born garden designer
- Rosemary Conley (born 1946), English businesswoman, author, and broadcaster on exercise and health
- Rosemary Corbin, Democratic public figure and former mayor of Richmond, California
- Rosemary Cove (born 1936), American sculptor
- Rosemary Cramp (1929–2023), British archaeologist
- Rosemary Crossley (1945–2023), Australian author and advocate for disability rights and facilitated communication
- Rosemary Crowley (born 1938), former Labor Senator for South Australia
- Rosemary Davies (1903–1963), American actress
- Rosemary De Angelis (1933–2020), American stage, screen, and television actress
- Rosemary DeCamp (1910–2001), American actress
- Rosemary Dempsey, former Vice President of The National Organization of Women
- Rosemary Dexter (1944–2010), Italian film actress
- Rosemary DiCarlo (born 1947), American diplomat
- Rosemary Dinnage (1928–2015), British author and critic
- Rosemary Dobson (1920–2012), Australian poet, illustrator, editor, and anthologist
- Rosemary Dunleavy, American ballet dancer
- Rosemary Dunsmore (born 1953), Canadian actress
- Rosemary E. Rodriguez, State Director for Senator Michael Bennet of Colorado
- Rosemary Eames (1965–2002), Australian swimmer with one arm
- Rosemary Edghill (born 1956), American writer and editor
- Rosemary Edmonds (1905–1998), British translator of Russian literature
- Rosemary Edna Sinclair (born 1936), Australian environmental and children's rights activist
- Rosemary Ellen Guiley (1950–2019), American writer and radio show host
- Rosemary Esehagu (born 1981), Nigerian writer
- Rosemary Fadljevic (born 1993), Australian basketball player
- Rosemary Feit Covey (born 1954), American printmaker
- Rosemary Firth (1912–2001), British social anthropologist, and Sir Raymond Firth's wife
- Rosemary Follett (born 1948), Australian politician
- Rosemary Foot (politician) (born 1936), former Australian politician
- Rosemary Foot (academic) (born 1948), Professor of International Relations and the John Swire Senior research Fellow in International Relations, St. Antony's College, Oxford
- Rosemary Forbes Kerry (1913–2002), American nurse, social activist, and John Forbes Kerry's mother
- Rosemary Forsyth (born 1943), Canadian-born American actress and model
- Rosemary Frankau (1933–2017), British actress
- Rosemary Georgeson, Coast Salish and Sahtu Dene filmmaker and multi-media artist
- Rosemary Gill (1930–2011), British children's television producer for the BBC
- Rosemary Gillespie (1941–2010), Australian lawyer, human rights activist, author, and film producer
- Rosemary Gillespie (biologist), American evolutionary biologist
- Rosemary Gilliat (1919–2004), Canadian photojournalist
- Rosemary Gladstar, American herbalist
- Rosemary Glyde (1948–1994), American violist and composer
- Rosemary Godin, former Canadian politician and current writer and Christian minister
- Rosemary Goldie (1916–2010), Australian Roman Catholic theologian
- Rosemary Goodchild (born 1936), English former cricketer
- Rosemary R. Gunning (1905–1997), American politician
- Rosemary Hall (political activist) (1925–2011), Scottish political organiser
- Rosemary Harris (born 1927), British actress
- Rosemary Harris (writer) (1923–2019), British author
- Rosemary Hayes (born 1942), British author
- Rosemary Hennessy (born 1950), American professor
- Rosemary Hill (born 1957), British historian
- Rosemary Hinkfuss (1931–2016), American former Wisconsin State Assembly member, and Green Bay Packers Board of Directors member
- Rosemary Hollis, British political scientist
- Rosemary Homeister Jr. (born 1972), American jockey in thoroughbred horse racing
- Rosemary Horrox (born 1951), English historian
- Rosemary Hughes, royal florist of Queen Elizabeth II
- Rosemary Hume (1907–1984), British cook and writer
- Rosemary Hunter, Australian academic
- Rosemary Hutton (1925–2004), British geophysicist and pioneer of magnetotellurics
- Rosemary Huxtable, senior Australian public servant
- Rosemary Jeffries, President of Georgian Court University, and Vice Chair of the New Jersey Presidents' Council Executive Board
- Rosemary Jenkinson (born 1967), Irish poet, playwright, and short story writer
- Rosemary Johnson (1913–1972), British actress
- Rosemary Joshua (born 1964), Welsh soprano
- Rosemary Joy Hendry (born 1945), British cultural anthropologist
- Rosemary Joyce (born 1956), American anthropologist and social archaeologist
- Rosemary Karuga (1928–2021), Kenyan visual artist.
- Rosemary Kennedy (1918–2005), oldest daughter of Joseph Sr. and Rose Fitzgerald Kennedy, and a sister of President John F. Kennedy, and Senators Robert F. Kennedy and Ted Kennedy
- Rosemary Kilbourn (born 1931), Canadian printmaker
- Rosemary Kirstein, American science fiction writer
- Rosemary Kuhlmann (1922–2019), American operatic mezzo-soprano and Broadway musical actress
- Rosemary Kurtz (1930–2017), American educator and politician
- Rosemary Kyburz (born 1944), Australian member of the Queensland State Parliament (1974–1983) as the Liberal Member for Salisbury
- Rosemary Laing (born 1959), Australian photographer
- Rosemary LaPlanche (1923–1979), Miss America in 1941
- Rosemary Lauder, English historian
- Rosemary Lain-Priestley (born 1967), Church of England priest
- Rosemary Lassig (1941–2017), Australian breaststroke swimmer
- Rosemary Leach (1935–2017), British stage, television, and film actress
- Rosemary Lehmberg (born 1949), American attorney
- Rosemary Lenton (born 1949), Scottish para-bowler and wheelchair curler
- Rosemary Leona, businesswoman from Vanuatu
- Rosemary Leonard (born 1956), British general practitioner and journalist
- Rosemary Little (born 1982), Australian Paralympic athlete
- Rosemary Low, British aviculturist, ornithologist, conservationist, writer, and parrot expert
- Rosemary Lowe-McConnell (1921–2014), English ichthyologist, ecologist, and limnologist
- Rosemary M. Collyer (born 1945), Senior United States District Judge of the United States District Court for the District of Columbia, and a United States Foreign Intelligence Surveillance Court member
- Rosemary M. Wixom (born 1948), former general president of the Primary of The Church of Jesus Christ of Latter-day Saints
- Rosemary Madigan (1926–2019), Australian sculptor, stonecarver and woodcarver
- Rosemary Mahoney (born 1961), American non-fiction writer
- Rosemary Manning (1911–1988), British author
- Rosemary Marcus, female Nigerian professional cyclist
- Rosemary Márquez (born 1968), Judge of the United States District Court for the District of Arizona
- Rosemary Martin (1936–1998), English actress
- Rosemary Mayer (1943–2014), American visual artist
- Rosemary McAuliffe (born 1940), American Democratic politician
- Rosemary McKenna (born 1941), Scottish Labour Party politician
- Rosemary McLeod (born 1949), New Zealand writer
- Rosemary Menkens (born 1946), Australian politician
- Rosemary Milgate (born 1959), Australian former swimmer
- Rosemary Morris (water polo) (born 1986), British water polo player
- Rosemary Mulligan (1941–2014), member of the Illinois House of Representatives from the 65th district
- Rosemary Murphy (1925–2014), American actress
- Rosemary Murray (1913–2004), British chemist
- Rosemary Pereira Gonçalves (also known as Rosemary or Rosemary Belkiss, born 1947), Brazilian singer
- Rosemary Museminali (born 1962), Rwandan politician and diplomat
- Rosemary Neering (born 1945), Canadian author and journalist
- Rosemary Nelson (1958–1999), Irish human rights solicitor
- Rosemary Nicols (born 1941), British actress
- Rosemary Nixon, Canadian author and novelist
- Rosemary O'Day, professor emeritus of history at Open University
- Rosemary Odinga (born 1977), Kenyan entrepreneur, advocate for alternative agriculture, and proponent of social equality
- Rosemary Okafor (born 1981), Nigerian sprinter
- Rosemary O'Leary, Edwin O. Stene Distinguished Professor of Public Administration at the University of Kansas
- Rosemary Opala (1923–2008), Australian artist, writer, and nurse
- Rosemary Owens, Australian Dean of Law at the University of Adelaide Law School
- Rosemary Park (1907–2004), American scholar, academic leader, and advocate for women's education
- Rosemary Pattenden, British Emeritus Professor of University of East Anglia
- Rosemary Payne (born 1933), British female discus thrower
- Rosemary Pollock (1944–2022), British writer
- Rosemary Potter (born 1952), American former Wisconsin State Assembly member
- Rosemary Pratt, Marchioness Camden (1921–2004), British socialite and artist, best known as Group Captain Peter Townsend's first wife
- Rosemary Prinz (born 1930), stage and television actress
- Rosemary Quispe (born 1983), Bolivian long-distance runner
- Rosemary R. Haggett, American Vice Chancellor for Academic Affairs and Student Success for the University of North Texas System
- Rosemary Radcliffe (born 1949), Canadian comic actress, writer, composer, and painter
- Rosemary Radford Ruether (1936–2022), American feminist scholar and Catholic theologian
- Rosemary Rapaport (1918–2011), English violinist and music teacher
- Rosemary Redfield, Canadian microbiologist at the University of British Columbia
- Rosemary Reed Miller (1939–2017), American business owner and historian
- Rosemary Ribeiro (born 1958), former international butterfly swimmer from Brazil
- Rosemary Rice (1925–2012), American actress, singer, and voice-over artist
- Rosemary Riddell, actor, film director, and Family Court judge from New Zealand
- Rosemary Roberts, American statistics educator
- Rosemary Rodriguez, film and television director
- Rosemary Rogers (1932–2019), American author
- Rosemary Rue (1928–2004), British physician and civil servant
- Rosemary S. Pooler (1938–2023), American judge
- Rosemary Sage, British academic
- Rosemary Sandlin (born 1946), American politician
- Rosemary Sassoon (born 1931), English handwriting expert
- Rosemary Sayigh (born 1935), British-born journalist and scholar of Middle Eastern history
- Rosemary Seninde (born 1965), Ugandan educator and politician
- Rosemary Sexton (born 1946), Canadian author and former columnist
- Rosemary Shrager (born 1951), British chef
- Rosemary Siemens, violinist and singer
- Rosemarie Sonora (born 1948), Filipino actress
- Lady Rosemary Spencer-Churchill, maid of honour to Queen Elizabeth II
- Rosemary Squire (born 1956), English theatre producer
- Rosemary Squires (1928–2023), international jazz, big band, cabaret and concert singer, and recording artist
- Rosemary Stasek (1963–2009), American elected official and activist in Afghanistan
- Rosemary Llanchie Stevenson, African-American ballet dancer
- Rosemary Sutcliff (1920–1992), English novelist
- Rosemary Theby (1892–1973), American film actress
- Rosemary Thomas (1901–1961), American poet
- Rosemary Thompson (born 1964), Director of Communications for Canada's National Arts Centre
- Rosemary Thomson, Canadian conductor and chorus master
- Rosemary Timperley (1920–1988), British writer
- Rosemary Tonks (1928–2014), English poet and author
- Rosemary Tumusiime (born 1962), Ugandan marketing professional, public administrator, feminist, and politician
- Rosemary Turare (born 1964), Papua New Guinean middle-distance runner
- Rosemary Uwemedimo, African stories writer of Nigerian origin
- Rosemary Valaire (1930–1999), ballet teacher, co-director, and dancer
- Rosemary Vandenbroucke (born 1981), Hong Kong-born singer
- Rosemary Varty (born 1933), Australian politician
- Rosemary Vercoe (1917–2013), British costume designer
- Rosemary Verey (1918–2001), English garden designer, lecturer, and prolific garden writer
- Rosemary Vodrey, former politician in Manitoba, Canada
- Rosemary Vrablic, American banker
- Rosemary Waring, honorary reader in human toxicology
- Rosemary Watson, American voice over artist, actress, and singer-songwriter
- Rosemary Wells (born 1943), American writer and illustrator
- Rosemary West (born 1953), English serial killer
- Rosemary Willis (born 1953), close witness during U.S. President John F. Kennedy's assassination
- Rosemary Willis (Miss Virginia) (born 1990), American beauty pageant titleholder
- Rosemary Winslow, American poet, and academic
- Rosemary Woolf (1925–1978), English scholar of medieval literature
- Rosemary Wyse (born 1957), Scottish astrophysicist and professor in physics and astronomy
- Rosemary Zwick (1925–1995), American printmaker and sculptor

== Fictional characters ==
- Rosemary, one of the two ugly stepsisters in Chris Colfer's The Land of Stories
- Rosemary Daniels, character from Australian soap opera Neighbours
- Rosemary King, character from British soap opera Emmerdale
- Rosemary Pilkington, character from How to Succeed in Business Without Really Trying and the derived movie with the same name
- Rosemary Woodhouse, main character in Rosemary's baby and its film adaptation
- Rosemary, a main protagonist from High Guardian Spice
