= Rosita =

Rosita may refer to:

== Places ==
- Rosita, Nicaragua, a municipality
- Rosita Airport, an airport that serves Rosita, Nicaragua
- La Rosita, Texas
- Rosita, Colorado
- Rosita North, Texas
- Rosita, Texas, formerly named Rosita South
- Nueva Rosita, a Mexican town often simply called Rosita
- Roşiţa, a village in Albota de Sus Commune, Taraclia district, Moldova

== People ==
- Rosita (given name), a given name (including a list of people with the name)
- Thea Trinidad (born 1990), American wrestler with the ring name Rosita

== Characters ==
- Rosita (Doctor Who), a one-off companion in Doctor Who
- Rosita (Sesame Street), a Muppet character on the children's TV series Sesame Street
- Rosita Espinosa, a character on the television series The Walking Dead
- Rosita, a character in the 2016 animated film Sing

== Other uses ==
- Rosita (band)
- Rosita (film), a 1923 silent film
- Cyclone Rosita, a 2000 tropical cyclone
- Rosita, a follower of Argentinean caudillo Juan Manuel de Rosas
- Rosita, the name of Joey Tribbiani's chair in Friends
- "La Rosita", a song by Gabriel Dupont (1878–1914)

== See also ==
- Reseda (disambiguation)
- Santa Rosita (disambiguation)
- Rosita Harbour
