= Albala =

Albala may refer to:

== People ==
- David Albala (1886-1942), Serbian military officer, physician, diplomat, and Jewish community leader
- Ken Albala, American professor of history
- Paulina Lebl-Albala (1891-1967), Serbian feminist, translator, literary critic, professor

== Other ==
- Albalá, a municipality located in the province of Cáceres, Extremadura, Spain
