= Marina Arsenijevic =

Serbian-born American pianist and composer

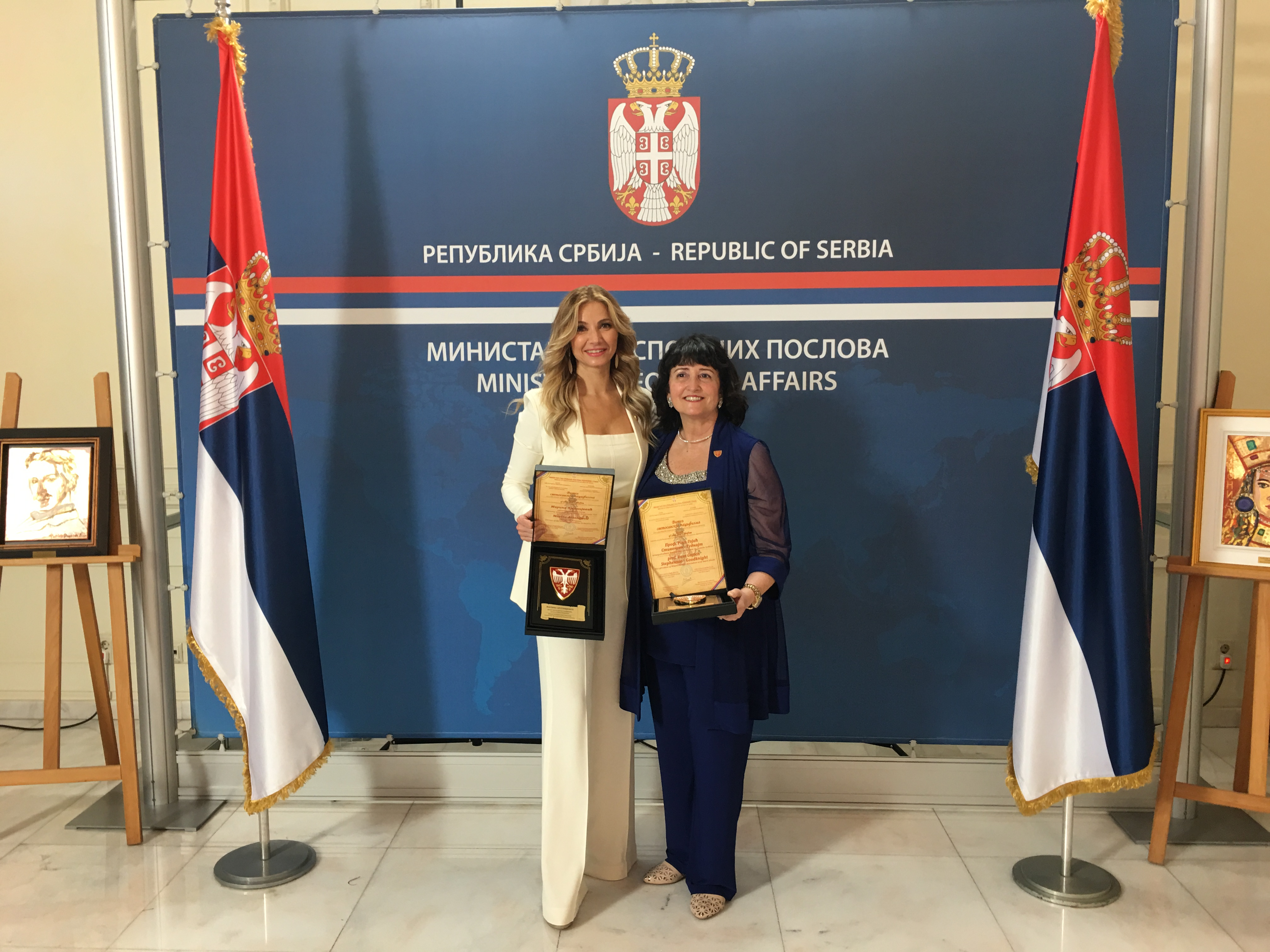
- Marina Arsenijevic & Rosie Stephenson-Goodknight (l-r), Knight of the St. Sava Order of Diplomatic Pacifism ceremony (2018)
- Born: Belgrade, Serbia
- Occupations: Concert pianist and composer
- Known for: Classical crossover music; playing on a transparent piano
- Notable work: Album "My Balkan Soul" and PBS TV show "Marina at West Point: Unity through Diversity"
- Spouse: Donald Bronn
- Website: http://arsmarina.com/

Marina Arsenijevic (born 1970) is a Serbian-born American pianist and composer who also goes by the professional name "Marina". She is known for playing on a transparent piano, recording popular albums in her native country, and performing on a PBS television show featuring her original compositions.

== Background ==
Arsenijevic was born in Belgrade to a soccer player father and a mother who worked for the government. She started playing the piano at age four and at age nine performed for an audience of 2,000 people. She began her higher education studies early, when she was only fifteen years old, later obtaining a master's degree from the University of Arts in Belgrade.

Arsenijevic has composed and performed in a classical crossover style, mixing and transforming genres. Described as being "unique to the ears, yet familiar to the soul", her compositions have combined ethno-rhythms with classical techniques." She recorded "Ethno Classic & Wolfgang Amadeus Mozart" in 1997 and "Mother Tongue" in 1999; both albums were produced in Serbia. In the United States, she released "My Balkan Soul" in 2002, as well as "Fire & Soul" in 2007, "Chopin: Waltzes" in 2004, and "Marina at West Point" in 2010.

As a concert performer in Serbia during the 1990s, Arsenijevic won several international piano competitions in Italy and ex-Yugoslavia. She also became known for her trademark transparent piano, playing on a see through instrument made of plexiglass, built by the German Schimmel Pianoworks company. Her peace concerts opposing the Kosovo conflict upset some government officials, and she was barred from making TV appearances. She instead played in shopping malls, hotels and music halls. In 1999, on the last day of bombing, Marina introduced her new composition "Kosovo" at the National Museum in Belgrade. As she played the deeply interwoven Christian and Muslim melodies of "Kosovo" with tears flowing down her face, she noticed that the audience also began to weep as everyone in the concert hall realized that Yugoslavia, as a united multi- cultural nation, was no more. The next day Marina was advised to leave the country immediately for her own safety. She was guided to the US Embassy in Budapest where by special bipartisan Congressional arrangement she was able to enter the United States as an artist of extraordinary ability. Following the ouster of extremists, Marina was invited by the newly formed moderate government to return to Serbia for a European concert tour and over 300,000 fans came to hear the music that helped calm a nation torn apart by hatred and violence. Following the tragedy of 9/11, Marina felt compelled to return to the United States to perform a series of benefit concerts for the victims and their families in Pennsylvania and Maryland and to thank the American people for their generosity in granting asylum in the United States to refugees in mixed Serbian- Muslim marriages who had fled persecution in Bosnia.

Arsenijevic continued her music career in the United States, playing solo at Carnegie Hall in 2003 and 2004. The program, "Marina in America", consisted of classic crossover music paired with a multimedia show. That same year, she performed at the White House for the First Ladies luncheon with former first lady Laura Bush and Cherie Blair, wife of the former Prime Minister of the United Kingdom. Arsenijevic performed at the Sheridan Opera House in Telluride, CO for astronaut Neil Armstrong benefiting Just For Kids Foundation. In 2004, she had a concert at the Forum Auditorium in Harrisburg, Pennsylvania. She has also played at the Chicago Symphony Center, Chicago's Navy Pier and the Toronto Centre for the Arts. Critics have described Marina as a "James Bond" beauty with a powerhouse technique that delivers an emotional punch like a "Balkan thunderbolt," while her compositions have been described as "breathtakingly original" and "captivating the soul".

Since 2008, Arsenijevic has been performing with the world renowned orchestral band of the West Point Military Academy and the West Point Cadet Glee Club . "Marina at West Point: Unity Through Diversity" was created and performed by Marina with the 120-member joint ensemble of the West Point Band and West Point Cadet Glee Club. The Concert was recorded live at West Point's historic Eisenhower Hall and will continue to be broadcast all across the country through 2019. She covered a wide repertoire comprising Liszt, Chopin, as well as Queen’s "Bohemian Rhapsody" and Sousa's "Stars & Stripes Forever". Also included were her original compositions, intertwining Muslim and Christian melodies inspired by Serbian and Balkan rhythms. The television show garnered her an Emmy nomination and was broadcast by PBS stations to approximately 180 million viewers since 2009, making it one of the longest running concert programs distributed by American Public Television. An accompanying album was released in 2009, produced by Grammy Award winner Gregory K. Squires and engineered by multiple primetime Emmy Award winner Ed Greene.

In 2013, Arsenijevic was interviewed by ABC NEWS channel WXYZ-TV about her joint concert with the Michigan Philharmonic called "Piano Adventures", which highlighted classical music heard in television commercials and benefited a children's charity. The following year, she composed music for the documentary "Tower to the People" and also performed at the film's premiere in Manhattan. Marina returned to West Point for the Labor Day Concert at the historic Trophy Point in 2014 performing her original composition "Balkan Suite". Marina was chosen to open the International Literary Peace Award in Dayton, Ohio in 2015, which was also the 20th Anniversary of the historic Dayton Peace Accords which ended the bloodiest conflict in Europe since World War II In 2017, Arsenijevic opened the Commemoration Program at West Point honoring the 72nd Anniversary of the Liberation of Auschwitz with her arrangement of "America the Beautiful" combined with Chopin's "Revolutionary Etude". Upcoming projects include composing music for a Broadway play on the life of Mileva Marić Einstein a gifted mathematician and the wife of Albert Einstein, whose overlooked contributions are now believed to be integral to the creation of the Theory of Relativity. Marina is also composing music for theatre, film and concert stage commemorating the life of her countryman, the renowned scientist Nikola Tesla

Arsenijevic has stated that "music has the power to communicate without a word, breaks the boundaries and brings people together, in good and bad. Such an impact should be used in diplomacy." Additionally, Arsenijevic has attended celebrity events like Harper's Bazaar magazine's anniversary party and opening night at the 2016 Tribeca Film Festival. She also appeared with Maye Musk to the 2016 DVF Awards and the 2015 Women & Fashion FilmFest in New York City.

== Awards ==
In 2010, Arsenijevic received an Emmy nomination for her musical compositions performed on the PBS show "Marina at West Point: Unity through Diversity". The Michigan Academy of the Sacred Heart gave her the "Leaders of Conscience" award in 2011. In 2014, she was presented with the "Ellis Island Medal of Honor", an award given to American citizens of immigrant heritage for their contributions to the nation. She was recognized for creating "a mixture of different ethnic melodies and rhythms". In 2018, Marina was elevated by Deputy Serbian Prime Minister and Minister of Foreign Affairs Ivica Dačić to a Knight of the St. Sava Order of Diplomatic Pacifism, in a ceremony conferring honors on those who deserved high diplomatic recognition, (Vitez svetosavskog pacifizma) for her work in promoting Serbian culture and traditions through her mission of "Unity Through Diversity.
