= Rosie (given name) =

Rosie is a feminine given name of English origin. It can be a diminutive form of the English language given name Rose, which is of Latin origin. Similar diminutives in other languages include: Rosa becoming Rosita in Spanish, and Ruža becoming Ružica in Slavic languages. Rosie can be a nickname for names such as Rosalie, Rosemary, Roseanne, Rosalyn, Rosanna, and more. It is occasionally a male nickname, primarily a short form of Roosevelt.

Historically, Rosie was a reasonably popular given name for infants in England and Wales during the early 21st century, as it had been in Victorian times. It continues to be popular in Scotland, as well. However, it has been rare as a given name for newborns in the United States since the 1980s. Rosaleen is also an Irish name, Rós Ailínn, meaning beautiful rose.

== People ==
=== Acting and comedy ===
- Rosie Bentham (born 2001), British actress
- Rosie Cavaliero (born 1968), British actress
- Rosie Fleeshman (born 1992), British actress
- Rosie Holt (born 1985), British actress and comedian
- Rosie Jones (comedian) (born 1990), British comedian and actress
- Rosie Malek-Yonan (born 1965), Assyrian actress, artist, director, author and activist
- Rosie Marcel (born 1977), English actress
- Rosie O'Donnell (born 1962), American comedian and talk show hostess
- Rosie Perez (born 1964), American actress
- Rosie Tenison (born 1968), American actress and model
- Rosie Tran (born 1984), American actress, writer, and stand-up comedian
- Rosie Wilby (born 1970), British comedian

=== Music ===
- Rosie Flores (born 1950), American musician
- Rosie Gaines, American vocalist, musician, singer-songwriter, and producer
- Rosie Ledet (born 1971), American, Creole Zydeco accordion player and singer
- Rosie Martin (born 1963), Canadian musician
- Rosie Munter (born 1987), Swedish, member of the pop group Play
- Rosie Nix-Adams (1958–2003), American singer-songwriter
- Rosie Ribbons (born 1983), Australian singer
- Rosie Smith (born 1984), English musician
- Rosie Thomas (singer-songwriter), American singer and songwriter

=== Politics ===
- Rosie Cooper (born 1950), British politician
- Rosie Douglas (1941–2000), Dominican politician, Prime Minister of Dominica in 2000
- Rosie Kane (born 1963), Scottish politician
- Rosie Méndez (born 1963), American politician
- Rosie Winterton (born 1958), British politician

=== Sports ===
- Rosie Bonds (born 1944), American hurdler
- Rosie Fordham (born 2002), Australian cross-country skier
- Rosie Grant (1908–1974), American football player
- Rosie Jones (golfer) (born 1959), American professional golfer
- Rosie Long (born 2006), Canadian wheelchair basketball player
- Rosie Manning (born 1950), American football player
- Rosie Napravnik (born 1988) American jockey
- Rosie Ruiz (1953–2019), Cuban-American who briefly "won" the Boston Marathon by cheating
- Rosie Swale-Pope (born 1946), British charity fundraiser

=== Writing ===
- Rosie Boycott, Baroness Boycott (born 1951), British journalist and feminist
- Rosie Scott (1948–2017), New Zealand author
- Rosie Stephenson-Goodknight (born 1953), American Wikipedia editor
- R. G. Waldeck (1898–1982), American author

=== Other fields ===
- Rosie Barnes (born 1946), British charity organiser and former politician
- Rosie Beaton, Australian radio announcer
- Rosie Boote (1878–1958), Irish chorus girl
- Rosie Huntington-Whiteley (born 1987), British supermodel
- Rosie Stancer (born 1960), English polar explorer

== Fictional characters ==
- Rosie Banks, in the Channel 4 soap opera, Brookside, played by actress Susan Twist
- "Rosie", aka Rosetta Cammeniti, in the Australian soap opera Neighbours
- Rosie Colton, in the BBC soap opera Doctors, played by Janice Connolly
- Rosie Cotton, in the Lord of the Rings series, by J. R. R. Tolkien
- Rosie Fox, in the ITV drama The Bill, played by actress Caroline Catz
- Rosie Fuentes, the main character in the children's TV show Rosie's Rules
- Rosie Grape, from the Christian children's direct-to-video series VeggieTales
- Rosie Hoyland, in the Australian soap opera Neighbours, played by actress Maggie Millar
- Rosie Miller, in the BBC soap opera EastEnders
- Rosie M. Banks, in Jeeves and Drones Club stories
- Rosie Mole, in Adrian Mole novels
- Rosie Perkins, protagonist in the 2023 film Hemet, or the Landlady Don't Drink Tea
- Rosie Redd, on the children's TV Show, Rainbow Rangers
- Rosie Webster, in the British TV soap opera Coronation Street
- Rosie the Riveter, American propaganda campaign to reduce labor shortages during the Second World War
- Rosie the Rocketeer, an anthropomorphic test dummy used by Boeing for Starliner test spaceflights
- Rosie the Robot Maid, in the animated TV show The Jetsons
- Rosie the Waitress, in commercials for Bounty paper towels, played by actress Nancy Walker
- Rodeo Rosie, on the American children's TV show Sesame Street
- Rosie (Big Daddy), a type of enemy in the popular 2007 video game BioShock and its sequel BioShock 2
- Rosie, a tank engine in the TV show Thomas and Friends
- Rosie, Cailou's little sister in the Canadian children's TV show Caillou
- Rosie, a baby girl in the animated film A Troll in Central Park
- Rosie, the roundabout in the children's TV show Playdays
- Rosie, a rag doll who was one of the titular characters in the British children's TV show Rosie & Jim
- Rosie, a black widow spider in the 1998 animated film A Bug's Life
- Rosie, a cat in the video game series Animal Crossing
- Rosie, an elephant in the novel Water for Elephants
- Rosie, the main character in the CBeebies show Everything's Rosie
- Rosie, a side character in Hazbin Hotel
