= Pattenden =

Pattenden is an English locational surname from a village in Kent which no longer exists.

== Notable people with this name include ==
- Alf Pattenden (1907-1976), English boxer
- Colin Pattenden (born 1947), English bass guitarist
- Jasper Pattenden (born 2002), English footballer
- Rosemary Pattenden, Emeritus Professor University of East Anglia
- Thomas Pattenden (1742-1791), English cricketer
