= Knight of the St. Sava Order of Diplomatic Pacifism =

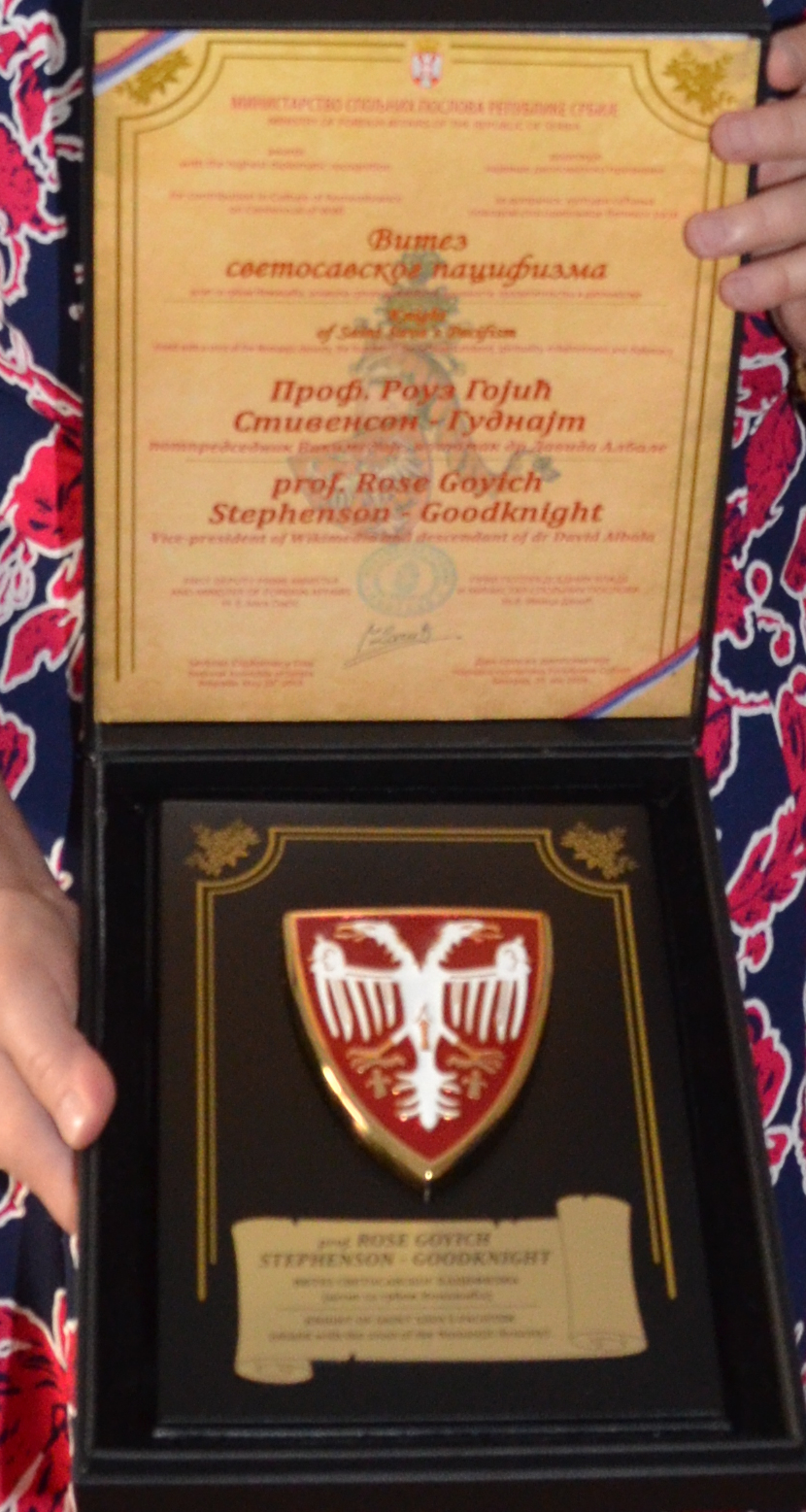
Knight of the St. Sava Order of Diplomatic Pacifism

Knight of the St. Sava Order of Diplomatic Pacifism (Serbian: Витез светосавског пацифизма, Vitez svetosavskog pacifizma) is a form of Knighthood awarded by the Foreign Ministry of Republic of Serbia, for humanitarian work.

Women who receive the award may use the honorific prefix Dame, and men Sir.

== Recipients ==
- Roksanda Ilinčić, 29 May 2018
- Ljiljana Marković, 29 May 2018
- Marina Arsenijevic, 29 May 2018
- Arno Gujon, 29 May 2018
- Mila Mulroney, 29 May 2018
- Rebecca MacDonald, 29 May 2018
- Gideon Graf, 29 May 2018
- Jelena Buhac Radojčić, 29 May 2018
- Gojko Rončević -Mraović, 29 May 2018
- Smilja Tišma, 29 May 2018
- Ivana Lučić, 29 May 2018
- Slobodanka Grković, 29 May 2018
- Rosie Stephenson-Goodknight, 29 May 2018
- Darko Tanasković, 29 May 2018

== See also ==
- Order of St. Sava
