= Katarina Bogdanović =

Serbian philosopher (1885–1969)

- Катарина Богдановић
- Bogdanović, ca. 1923
- Born: 28 October 1885; Trpinja, Austria-Hungary
- Died: 11 January 1969 (aged 83); Kragujevac, Yugoslavia
- Occupations: Teacher, women's rights activist, philosopher
- Years active: 1905–1963

Katarina Bogdanović (28 October 1885 OS / 10 November 1885 NS – 11 January 1969) is often referred to as the first woman philosopher of Serbia and one of the first women to write a high school textbook in the country. Born in Trpinja, at the time in Austria-Hungary, after three years of primary schooling, she moved to Belgrade to complete her secondary education. She graduated from the normal school in Karlovac in 1904, and then taught elementary school until 1906 in Tuzla. Wanting to further her education, she resigned, and enrolled to study languages, philosophy, and Serbian literature at the University of Belgrade. Graduating in 1910, she taught at the private girls' high school in Smederevo for two years. She began graduate studies in Grenoble and in Paris at the Sorbonne, but returned to the Kingdom of Serbia in 1913 to teach at the Second Girls' High School of Belgrade.

In the interwar period, Bogdanović became involved in the women's rights and pacifist movements, and began publishing numerous reviews and translations in literary journals. In 1923, she and Paulina Lebl-Albala published Teorija književnosti (Literary Theory), the first high school textbook to be written by women in the country. She traveled widely attending both human rights conferences and visiting schools and colleges to learn about teaching methods in use in other countries. An atheist, she distrusted politicians and political parties and chose not to marry, believing that marriage made women legal subordinates to their husbands. She wrote that women could only realize their full potential if power structures were changed to remove barriers that denied them equal opportunities. She was appointed as principal of the Girls' High School in Niš in 1928, becoming one of the first two women to head a woman's school in Serbia. She transferred as principal of the Women's Gymnasium in Kragujevac in 1932, teaching until 1940, when she was forcibly retired for communist sympathies, although she never joined the Communist Party.

After World War II, Bogdanović was active in the Women's Antifascist Front. She was editor of the journal Naša stvarnost (Our Reality) and published literary analysis and articles on current events. A recipient of the Order of St. Sava in the fifth degree for her cultural contributions to the city of Niš, she was recognized as an honorary citizen of Kragujevac in 1955, and was honored with the Order of Labour, second class, in 1958. She retired from public lecturing in 1963 and moved into a pensioners’ home in Kragujevac, where she died in 1969. Posthumously, some of her writings were published by her biographer Milan Nikolić. Streets in Kragujevac and in Čukarica, Belgrade were named in her honor and a plaque was placed on her childhood home in Tripinja in 1990.

== Early life and education ==
Katarina Bogdanović was born on 28 October 1885 (Note: Most sources show the Old Style date of 28 October, but Zarić gives the New Style date of 10 November 1885.) in Trpinja, at the time in Syrmia County, Kingdom of Croatia-Slavonia of Austria-Hungary. She attended three years of primary schooling in her hometown and then went to Belgrade, at the time in the Kingdom of Serbia, where she finished her primary education and graduated from the Girls' High School. She then moved back to Austria-Hungary to Karlovac and completed four years of training at the normal school in 1904. From a young age, Bogdanović decided to reject patriarchal rules and live life on her own terms. She wrote in a diary that she would "sacrifice everything" to be able to learn and confirmed that she was an atheist. She taught primary school in Tuzla from 1904 and 1906, in Bosnia under Austro-Hungarian rule, where one of her colleagues was Veljko Čubrilović, later an assassin of Archduke Franz Ferdinand of Austria.

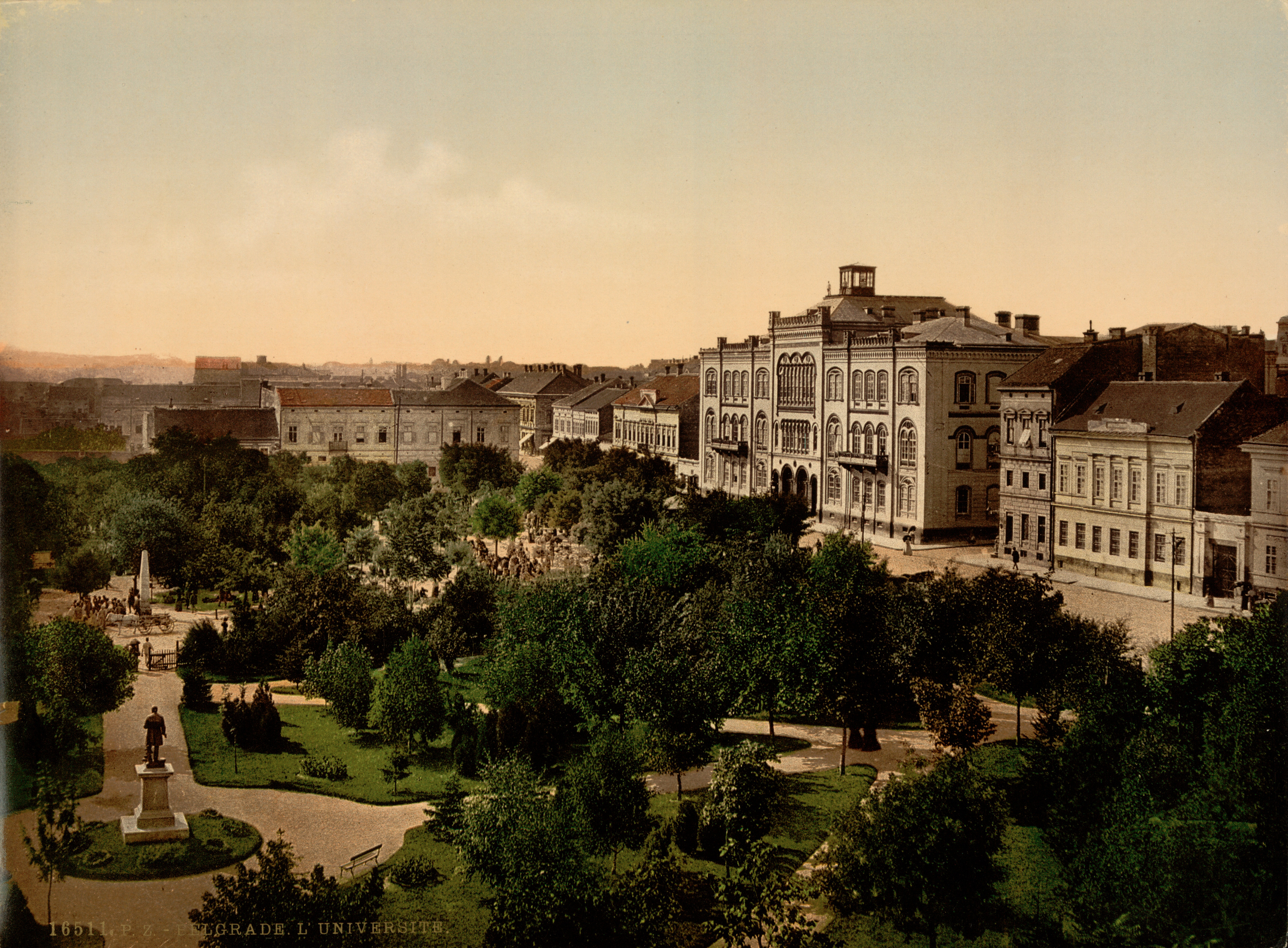
University of Belgrade

Deciding after two years to continue her education, Bogdanović returned to the capital of Serbia and enrolled at the University of Belgrade intent on studying philosophy, languages (English, French, and German), and literature. Her parents, especially her father, did not agree with her decision to leave teaching and her mother could not understand why she refused to marry. Her relationship with her family was strained and she rarely wrote to them. She wrote in her diary that marriage was not a natural state, but one designed to enslave women and keep them chained to their spouse. She also wrote that with marriage, she would have to have had children, which would have prevented her from furthering her education or traveling. Bogdanović's choices meant that she was largely responsible for financing her own education. She studied under Branislav Petronijević and Jovan Skerlić, who influenced her thoughts on civic responsibility. During her schooling, she began to participate in socialist protests.

== Career ==
Her biographer Milan Nikolić stated that upon completing her schooling in 1910, Bogdanović graduated as the first woman to earn a degree in philosophy and Serbian literature at the University of Belgrade. Skerlić recommended that she accept a position as a teacher at the private girls' high school in Smederevo, but after two years, Bogdanović resigned. She studied for four months in Grenoble, France, and then went to Paris in 1912 to do post-graduate work at the Sorbonne. She joined the Fédération communiste anarchiste (Anarchist Communist Federation) in 1913, which was a left-wing intellectual and anti-war association. The organization was in favor of radical unionization, which she adopted in both her life and work. During her stay in France, she became aware of the fight for women's civil and political rights, which would be a focus for the rest of her life. Invited by the Ministry of Education of the Kingdom of Serbia to return to teaching, she taught philosophy and literature at the Second Girls' High School of Belgrade from 1913 to 1928. During this period, she traveled often and attended educational seminars, including a course on the Dalton Plan held in Bristol, England in 1922. She combined visits to cultural venues with trips to study different educational systems and methods used at varying schools and colleges in order to become familiar with the range of educational systems and innovations in teaching in England, Germany and France. She used these trips as the foundation for publishing articles on how education in Serbia could be improved. She argued that schooling at that time taught students to be conformist and dependent, by rewarding their obedience, rather than preparing them for life and rewarding them for their creativity. She advocated for the abolition of grading systems and in favor of allowing students to participate in their own governance by creating self-governing student organizations that would teach them about the responsibilities of the state and duties and rights of its citizens.

When the National University, later the Kolarac National University, was founded in Belgrade in 1922, Bogdanović, Ksenija Atanasijević, Isidora Sekulić, and Zorka Vulović were the first women to lecture there. They attracted wide attendance, often because it was so unusual for a woman to be engaged in academic and scientific work. Bogdanović's most productive writing period roughly corresponded with the interwar period, at the time of the Kingdom of Yugoslavia. She began to publish book reviews and translations of writers from a variety of fields like Honoré de Balzac, Denis Diderot, Henry Ford, Blasco Ibanez, George Meredith, among others. In 1923, she and Paulina Lebl-Albala published the first high school textbook written by women in the country. Teorija književnosti (Literary Theory) was used in Serbian high schools for eighteen years (up to the start of World War II), and was updated in at least five editions. She reviewed Alexandra Kollontai's Nova žena (New Woman, 1918), Truska Baginska's Prosvećena žena (An Enlightened Woman, 1926), and published an article about French writer and artist Jean Cocteau in 1933. She analyzed numerous works from Russian writers like Dostoevsky, Maxim Gorky, Ivan Turgenev, and Tolstoy and German philosophers such as Nietzsche and Arthur Schopenhauer. Many of her articles appeared in the Serbian Literary Herald, the most influential literary journal of the time.

In 1928, Bogdanović was appointed principal of the Girls' High School in Niš, becoming one of the first two women to head a woman's school in Serbia. (Note: Leposava Smodlaka, who shares the distinction of being first women to head a girls' school, was also appointed in 1928 as the principal of the Women's Gymnasium in Kragujevac.) That year she was elected president of the Association of Secondary School Teachers and was named to the Order of St. Sava in the fifth degree for her cultural contributions to the city of Niš. She moved to Kragujevac in 1932, becoming the principal of the Women's Gymnasium. That year the Kragujevac branch of the Удружење универзитетски образованих жена (Association of University Educated Women) was established and Bogdanović was elected as its president. She encouraged her students to follow their consciences and be socially engaged. Along with the students at the Boys' High School, her pupils participated annually in May Day worker's actions. In 1937, the rally turned into an anti-fascist protest with a demonstration in front of the Officers' Club building. When Hitler's troops annexed Sudetenland, the Girls' High School organized a strike and students protested by taking their final examination in French rather than German. Bogdanović supported her students in these actions and intervened with the police on their behalf, leading the Minister of Education to forcibly retire her in 1940 on the grounds that her leftist ideas and communist sympathies made her unfit to teach impressionable youth. In her diaries, Bogdanović wrote that she distrusted politicians and political parties, primarily because she saw them as devoid of ethics and questing for power at the expense of humanity.

== Activism ==
In 1919, Bogdanović, Zorka Kasnar, Lebl-Albala and other activists formed the Drustvo za prosvećivanje žene i zaštitu njenih prava (Society for Women's Enlightenment and Protection of their Rights). The following year, they began a publishing arm for the organization establishing a magazine, Ženski pokret (Women's Movement), with Kasnar as the first editor-in-chief. She was followed before the end of the year by Bogdanović, who was the main editor through 1921. That year, they also produced a collection of articles entitled Pravo glasa za žene (Suffrage for Women). Bogdanović's contribution was the chapter "Pravo glasa za žene činovnike" ("Women Officials' Right to Vote"). Two years later, the organization created a working network to provide courses for women in hatmaking and tailoring, and assistance with employment. Simultaneously, they founded a women's shelter to provide lodging and sanitary conditions for women in need. They conducted educational courses to help women become informed of social issues and responsibilities of public life and also offered classes in learning foreign languages.

Bogdanović was no longer active with the Society for Women's Enlightenment after 1923, but she remained involved in the international women's movement. With five other Yugoslav delegates, she attended the Women's International League for Peace and Freedom (WILPF) summer school in Salzburg, Austria, in 1921. Following the event, she published two reports in Ženski pokret. She adhered to a path of non-violence and believed in active resistance. That September, she went to London where she volunteered at a settlement house to gain practical experience in women's efforts in assisting each other and the poor. She was a delegate to the Rome congress of the International Woman Suffrage Alliance in 1923, and upon her return published an analysis of the proceedings in the Serbian Literary Herald. In her review that year of Kollontai's New Woman, Bogdanović supported the author's radical theories regarding double standards and repressive social policies aimed at limiting women's rights. Kollontai was critical of sexual politics, particularly those that exploited women. She questioned traditions about sexual morality and the nuclear family, which made women property and denied the instinctual nature of sexuality. In 1924, Bogdanović published Klara Cetkin: žene i student (Clara Zetkin: Women and Students), analyzing the argument that women could only gain freedom within the radical socialist revolution. She concurred with Zetkin that this was because workers understood women's fight for equal pay and rights, whereas academics saw women only as competition and favored pushing them out of their fields of expertise and back into their family duties. She expanded on Zetkin's ideas to conclude that the underlying unifying element was that workers and women shared a lower social class.

Bogdanović's philosophy was informed by a wide variety of intellectuals including Alfred Adler, Pearl S. Buck, Vladislav Petković Dis, and Isidora Sekulić, among others. Analyzing Adler's concept of the creative self, Freud's theories on sexuality, and Carl Jung's ideas on personal freedom and interpersonal relationships, she concluded that people could only be free and autonomous if they were not restricted by traditions or obstacles in their environment. Recognizing that social structure had transformed many times, she stated that if women were to fully develop their inner selves and participate on an equal basis, social organization would need to remove the barriers that prevented their growth. In her diary, Bogdanović rejected socially assigned roles based on hierarchies or dogma, believing authority should be based on merit. These beliefs led her to participate between 1920 and 1930 in international congresses held in cities such as Athens, Brussels, Kraków, and London to discuss developments in the League of Nations and human rights. In 1939, Bogdanović went to the United States, visiting Washington, D.C., and New York City. She attended lectures at Columbia University, visited schools, and met with feminists like Adela Milčinović. She chronicled her trip in her diary, noting her observations of the culture.

During World War II, Bogdanović remained in Yugoslavia and curtailed her activities, but was arrested and imprisoned twice and threatened with being shot because of her leftist ideas. She was released because there was no evidence, since she was living in isolation and caring for a younger sister at the time. At the end of the war, with the establishment of the Federal People's Republic of Yugoslavia, Bogdanović was under pressure by the new government to join the Communist Party. Regardless of her left-leaning ideas, she never bowed to that. In 1945, she became the president of the Kragujevac branch of the Women's Antifascist Front. She remained active in the organization until 1953, when it was abolished. She became editor of a newly launched journal Naša stvarnost (Our Reality), which published articles on current events and literature. She also gave public lectures on education and literature. Bogdanović was recognized as an honorary citizen of Kragujevac in 1955, and received the Order of Labour, second class, in 1958. She continued to write and keep diaries, but intentionally destroyed some of her work. She wrote about the isolation caused by aging, when she was no longer invited to participate in intellectual and cultural events. In her old age, she regretted that she had spent her career teaching in small towns, as it contributed to her losing the social and intellectual networks that would have been available to her in Belgrade. She moved into the local pensioners' home in 1963, and was rarely visited, except by the local Kragujevac writer Milan Nikolić. He convinced her not to burn all of her works, publishing an article about her contributions to Serbian culture in 1965.

== Death and legacy ==
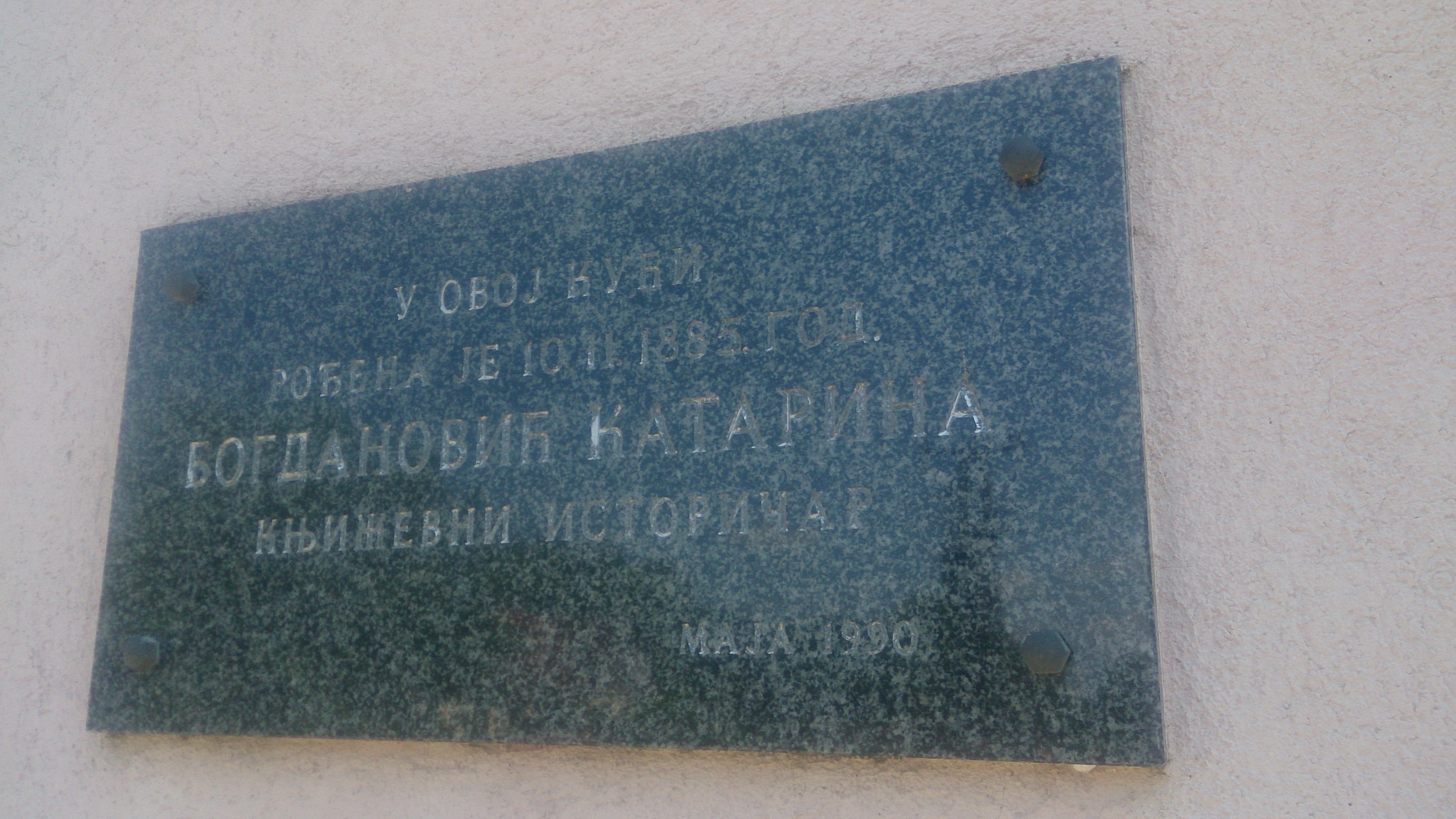
Plaque on Bogdanović's childhood home in Trpinja

Bogdanović died on 2 March 1969 in Kragujevac and was buried in the Varoško cemetery. After her death Nikolić gathered some of her manuscripts and papers and published the book Izabrani život: dnevnici, eseji, studije i kritike (The Chosen Life: Diaries, Essays, Studies and Reviews) in 1986. That same year the Крагујевачки књижевни клуб (Kragujevac Literary Club) was renamed in her honor. Her legacy was forgotten, her grave overgrown with weeds, and the literary club was renamed in 2011 as the Udruženje pisaca Kragujevac (Kragujevac Writers' Association) because club members felt she had not left a large literary legacy. Literature and women's studies professor, Svetlana Tomić, confirmed in a 2019 article that Bogdanović and other leading teachers and activists were forgotten and their importance diminished by subsequent generations. Tomić described Bogdanović as "one of the leading intellectuals of the time, appreciated for her sharp-minded, critical insights in book reviews, essays, and pedagogical debate". Twenty-first century journalists often refer to her as the first woman to become a philosopher in Serbia. She pointed out that studying her archives and those of other activist teachers gave insights into how women's spaces changed over time, as well as the significance of their contributions to Serbian history. Streets in Kragujevac and in Čukarica, Belgrade bear her name. In 1990, a plaque was placed on her family's home in Trpinja.
