= Romy =

Romy is a given name, often a diminutive form of names such as Rosemary or Romina, Romilda, Romana, Roman or Romeo. People with the name include:

== Men ==
- Romy Cachola, nickname of Romeo Munoz Cachola, Philippines-born Hawaiian politician
- Romy Diaz (1940–2005), real name José Roméo Bustillos Díaz, Filipino actor
- Romy González (born 1996), nickname of Roman A. González, American baseball player for the Chicago White Sox
- Romy Gosz (1910–1966), nickname for Roman Luis Gosz, American polka musician
- Romy Haag (born 1948), real name Edouard Frans Verba, Dutch dancer and singer
- Romy Hoffman (born 1980), Australian hip-hop singer known as Macromantics
- Romy Pastrana (born 1958), nickname of Romeo Pastrana, Filipino actor, comedian, and politician
- Romy Gauchan Thakali, Nepali politician
- Romy Tiongco, Filipino former Catholic priest and Christian Aid worker
- Romy van Oojen (born 1971), Belgian singer and former member of 2 Unlimited

== Women ==
- Romy Bühler (born 1994), Swiss figure skater
- Romy Dya, Dutch singer-songwriter
- Romy Eggimann (born 1995), Swiss ice hockey player
- Romy Farah (born 1985), Colombian professional tennis player
- Romy Gill (born 1972), British-Indian chef, food writer, author, and broadcaster
- Romy Gruber (born 1993), Luxembourger footballer
- Romy Kalb-Gundermann (1934–2019), German soprano
- Romy Kasper (born 1988), German racing cyclist
- Romy Kermer (born 1956), German figure skating coach and pair skater
- Romy Logsch (born 1982), German bobsledder
- Romy Madley Croft (born 1989), English singer and guitarist, known mononymously for solo work as Romy
- Romy Mars (born 2006), American singer, songwriter, actress, daughter of Sofia Coppola and Thomas Mars
- Romy McCahill (born 1993), Scottish model and beauty pageant titleholder
- Romy Monteiro (born 1992), Dutch singer, actress, and TV presenter
- Romy Müller (born 1958), East German athlete
- Romy Pansters (born 1996), Dutch Paratriathlete and Paralympic swimmer
- Romy Papadea, Greek songwriter
- Romy Rosemont (born 1964), American actress
- Romy Saalfeld (born 1960), German competitive rower
- Romy Salvador (born 1998), French footballer
- Romy Schmidt (born 1965), Chilean lawyer, academic, researcher and politician
- Romy Schneider (1938–1982), nickname for Rosemarie Magdalena Albach, German-French actress
- Romy Simpkins (born 1993), British model, mental health ambassador, and beauty pageant titleholder
- Romy Speelman (born 2000), Dutch footballer
- Romy Tarangul (born 1987), German judoka
- Romy Teitzel (born 1999), Australian rugby league footballer
- Romy Timmins (born 1989), Australian rules footballer
- Romy Tittel, Canadian politician and former leader of the Green Party of Alberta
- Romy Weiß-Scherberger (1935–2016), nickname for Rosemarie Weiß-Scherberger, German fencer

== Fictional characters ==
- Romy White, one of the main characters in the films Romy and Michele's High School Reunion and Romy and Michele: In the Beginning, played by Mira Sorvino
- Romy, a character in the Spanish animated series, Around the World with Willy Fog
- Romy, the protagonist of the 2019 Dutch drama film, Romy's Salon, based on the book of the same name by Tamara Bos
