= Rebecca MacDonald =

Canadian businesswoman from Toronto, Ontario

- Born: Ubavka Mitić; 1953 (age 72–73); Sarajevo, PR Bosnia and Herzegovina, FPR Yugoslavia
- Occupation: Businesswoman

Rebecca MacDonald (born 1953 as Ubavka Mitić) is a Serbian Canadian businesswoman that lives and works in Toronto, Ontario. Recipient of several business awards, she is founder and executive chair of Just Energy Group Inc., an energy commodities trading company.

== Career ==
New deregulation in Ontario's natural gas industry prompted Rebecca MacDonald to launch EMI in 1986. Her first company began to lose profits when gas prices fell several years later. In 1997, she re-entered the market by starting Ontario Energy Savings Corp., though the business showed minimum profits. When gas prices began to rise again in 2001, the second company was transitioned into a very profitable fund that became the backbone of Just Energy Group Inc. By taking Just Energy public, Macdonald made the company accountable to a board of directors. When gas prices fell again, the business expanded to the American and European markets, but also came under scrutiny for aggressive sales techniques and charging additional fees.

== Extracurricular ==
MacDonald sits on the board of Canadian Pacific Railway Ltd., the Royal Ontario Museum and the David Foster Foundation. She donated three million dollars to Toronto's Mount Sinai Hospital to fight rheumatoid arthritis, a disease she herself has battled with. In 2017, MacDonald had the honour of ringing the bell at the New York Stock Exchange. That same year, as part of the Horatio Alger Association of Canada, she was one of the hosts of the charity event "Canuck Place Gala", alongside Lorne Michaels.

== Honors and awards ==
In 2002, the Rotman School of Management gave MacDonald the Canadian Woman Entrepreneur of the Year award. She was also Profit magazine's top Canadian Woman Entrepreneur six years in a row. Profit ranked her company as one of the fastest-growing companies in Canada from 2004 through to 2007. MacDonald is a 2009 Horatio Alger Award Winner and also has an honorary doctorate from the University of Victoria.

In 2018, MacDonald was a recipient of the "Knight of the St. Sava Order of Diplomatic Pacifism" award. The honor was bestowed upon her by the Serbian Minister of Foreign Affairs Ivica Dačić.
