= Elizabeth Butterworth =

English artist

Elizabeth Butterworth (born 1949) is an English artist, especially known for her paintings of parrots. She was born in Rochdale, Lancashire, and studied at the Rochdale School of Art 1966–1968, Maidstone College of Art 1968–1971, and at the Royal College of Art in London 1971–1974. She has had numerous solo exhibitions of her work. Publications containing her work include:

- 1978 – Parrots and Cockatoos. (Text by Rosemary Low). Fischer Fine Art: London.
- 1983 – Amazon Parrots. (With Rosemary Low). Rodolphe d'Erlanger: London.
- 1989 – Parrots, Macaws. Cockatoos: The Art of Elizabeth Butterworth. Abrams: New York.
- 1993 – Macaws. Rodolphe d'Erlanger: London
