= Santa Rosita =

Santa Rosita may refer to:

- Santa Rosita State Park, a place in the fictional city of Santa Rosita, California in the comedy film It's a Mad, Mad, Mad, Mad World. Although it’s noted as that in the movie, the city featured to be “Santa Rosita” was all shot and represented as Los Angeles.
- Santa Rosita Formation, a geological formation (upper Furongian–Tremadocian) in the Tilcara Range, Cordillera Oriental of Jujuy, Argentina
- Santa Rosita, Guatemala, a place nearby the Polochic River in Guatemala
- a neighborhood of Guatemala City, Guatemala
- Santa Rosita (cantón), a subdivision of the Vallegrande Municipality in Bolivia
- a neighborhood in the UPZ (Unidades de Planeamiento Zonal) of Boyacá Real of the locality of Engativá in Bogotá, Colombia
- Santa Rosita y el péndulo proliferante, a 1972 book by Peruvian writer Mirko Lauer
