= Paulina Lebl-Albala =

Serbian literary academic (1891–1967)

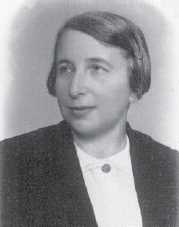
- Born: Paulina Lebl; August 9, 1891; Belgrade, Kingdom of Serbia
- Died: October 8, 1967 (aged 76); Inglewood, California, US
- Education: University of Belgrade Faculty of Philology
- Known for: Co-founder, first president, Udruženje univerzitetski obrazovanih žena (Association of University-Educated Women)
- Spouse: David Albala
- Relatives: Rosie Stephenson-Goodknight (granddaughter)

Paulina Lebl-Albala (Serbian Cyrillic: Паулина Лебл-Албала; August 9, 1891 – October 8, 1967) was a Serbian feminist, translator, literary critic, literature theoretician, and professor of literature in Belgrade. A co-founder of the Udruženje univerzitetski obrazovanih žena (UUOZ; Association of University-Educated Women) (established 1927), she also served as the organization's president. Rosie Stephenson-Goodknight is her granddaughter.

== Early years and education ==
Paulina (sometimes spelled Pauline) Lebl (sometimes spelled Lebel) was born in Belgrade, Serbia (Note: The Principality of Bulgaria is also mentioned as a tentative place of birth.) She was the youngest child in the family of Simon Lébl, an engineer in the French company which raised the railway in Serbia. Her mother was Natalie and there were three sisters, Hermina, Jelena, and Ruža. She grew up in the city's Ashkenazi community. She finished elementary and middle school in Niš, with third and fourth year at the Girls' College (1904–06). Between 1906 and 1909, she attended and graduated from the First Women's Gymnasium, studying under Jovan Skerlić, Pavle Popović (1868–1939), and Bogdan Popović in the Faculty of Philosophy, classics department, where she participated in the literary club "Nada".

== Career ==
Her published translations of Glanz and Allegro furiozo by Ida Boy-Ed appeared in Politika in 1906 and 1907 and were the first translations of Boy-Ed's work. The Prosvetni pregled (Education Review) No. 1, released "On reading", in 1909, for which she won an award. In the same year, she began studies in architecture in Belgrade, leaving after a semester. From 1909 through 1913, she studied Serbian and French literature at the University of Belgrade Faculty of Philology. In 1909 and in 1912–14, she published translations of Johann Wolfgang von Goethe, Ludwig Thoma, Paul-Louis Hervier, Maurice Barrès, Heinrich Heine, Gustave Flaubert, and Oscar Wilde; during the same period, she published the original works of Victor Hugo, as well as literary and theater reviews. At the end of 1913, Lebl-Albala began teaching at the First Women's Gymnasium.

From 1914 until 1918, Lebl-Albala published in the journals Odjek ("Response") (Nis), Književni jug ("Literary South") (Zagreb), and Moderna žena ("Modern Women") (Zagreb); she was in Switzerland 1917–18. Lebl-Albala was back in Belgrade in 1918–39. She became a professor in the Second Girls Gymnasium in 1920. She married David Albala, a physician, Zionist leader and president of Belgrade's Sephardi community on March 14 of that year at the Sephardic Synagogue. They had a daughter, Jelena Albala Gojić in 1925. A feminist, she became a member of the Drustvo za prosvećivanje žene i zaštitu njenih prava ("Society for Women's Enlightenment and Protection of their Rights") in 1925, she was also active in Zionist youth work. Other memberships included the Management Association of Professors and PEN Club. She was the first president of the Association of University-Educated Women, and served in that role for eight years.

A literature theoretician, from 1919 through 1939, Lebl-Albala wrote essays, literary discussions, criticism, reviews, stories, travel articles about women and youth, translations and other contributions which were published in newspapers and journals; some of these were, Revue Yougoslave, Misao, Ženski pokret, Prosvetni glasnik, SKG, Prilozi, LMS, Strani pregled, Politika, Javnost, Književni jug, Glasnik jugoslovenskog ženskog saveza, Beogradske opštinske novine, Južni pregled, Krug, Naša stvarnost, Život i rad, Žena danas, and Vidici. She wrote discussions and reviews of the works of Dositej Obradović, Njegoš, Ljubomir Nenadović, Jovan Skerlić, Borisav Stanković, Branislav Nušić, Bogdan Popović, Jovan Sterija Popović, Jovan Dučić, Stanislav Vinaver, as well as Heine, Hugo, Hermann Hesse, Agnes Smedley, and Germaine de Staël. Her work appeared in a number of publications, including Ljubomir Nenadović's, Odabrane strane (1926), Božidar Knežević's, Misli (1931), Bulletin of the Association of University-Educated Women (1931-1935), L'Oeuvre litteraire des femmes yougoslaves (1936), in which she wrote the preface and introduction of individual chapters, as well as Monahinja Jefimija (1936). In 1937, she became the editor of Glasnik Jugoslovenskog ženskog saveza ("Bulletin of the Yugoslav Women's Alliance").

"In addition to Isidora Sekulić and Ksenija Atanasijević, among the first on the literary scene was Paulina Lebl Albala (...) one of the rarer emancipated and university-educated women in Serbia. She belonged to the generation of enterprising Serbian intellectuals associated with the momentum of modern enlightenment." (Predrag Palavestra, History of Serbian literary criticism, 2008, p. 345)

In 1940, she moved to Washington, D.C., joining her husband at the Yugoslav Embassy. She wrote for the Yugoslav News Bulletin (Yugoslav Information Center, New York City, 1942) and in Pittsburgh newspapers (1941, 1944–45). After her husband's death in 1942, Lebl-Albala and her daughter settled in New York City. Lebl-Albala returned to Belgrade in 1945, and was mentioned in the 1947 edition of the Columbia Dictionary of Modern European Literature in the section on Serbian writers. She did translation work for Metro-Goldwyn-Mayer and Columbia Pictures during this time. In 1947, she made Aliyah with the first group of emigrants for Israel, after which, she visited Rome (1951–53) and Windsor, Ontario, Canada (1955), before emigrating to the US where she lived with her daughter in Los Angeles, California.

== Death and legacy ==
Lebl-Albala died in Inglewood, California in 1967. She is mentioned in Encyclopaedia Hebraica, Jewish Almanac, and the Bulletin of the Association of Yugoslav Jews in the United States. Published in 2005, Tako je nekad bilo ("That's how it once was") is a compilation book of Lebl-Albala's memories.

== Selected works ==
- 1930, Razvoj universitetskog obrazovanja naših žena
- 1923; 1930, Teorija književnosti i analiza pismenih sastava za srednje i stručne škole (with Katarina Bogdanović)
- 1932, Gertruda
- 1939, Deset godina rada Udruženja univerzitetski obrazovanih žena u Jugoslaviji: 1928-1938
- 1943, Yugoslav women fight for freedom (text)
- 1943, Dr. Albala as a Jewish National Worker
- 1951, Izabrana proza
- 2005, Tako je nekad bilo (posthumous publication)
