= Rosemary Stasek =

American politician and activist (1963-2009)

- Born: August 10, 1963; McAdoo, Pennsylvania
- Died: September 24, 2009 (aged 46); Kabul, Afghanistan
- Education: Cornell University
- Occupations: Politician, activist
- Known for: Mountain View, California City Council

Rosemary Stasek (August 10, 1963 – September 24, 2009) was an American elected official and activist in Mountain View, California who traveled to Afghanistan regularly to offer outreach efforts to the girls and women living there.

== Biography ==
Stasek was born in McAdoo, Pennsylvania to a mother who worked in the garment industry and a coal miner father. She was the first in her family to attend college, graduating from Cornell University in Ithaca, New York, with a Bachelor's degree in Economics in 1985. She made the Dean's List and was the manager of the football and wrestling teams.

In 2009, she was one of 25 alumnae recognized for efforts "to better the lives of women locally and who embody the richness of internationalism" and served as keynote speaker at the University's Recognition Reception for Outstanding Work for the Advancement of Women, held as part of International Women's Day.

=== Politician ===
She was elected to the Mountain View, California City Council in 1996 and re-elected in 2000. That year, she was elected by the Council to serve as the city's Mayor. During her time in office, she also chaired the Council's Technology Committee. Stasek represented Mountain View on the CalTrain Policy Advisory Board and the Santa Clara County Emergency Preparedness Council. These two organizations oversaw and addressed issues of Homeland Security in the US.

=== Activist ===
She first traveled to Afghanistan in 2002. The trip inspired her to found the nongovernmental organization called, "A Little Help." Through her efforts during regular trips to the country, she set out to help the local population by building new schools, contributing books and medical supplies and working in women's prisons and maternity hospitals.

Stasek was an award-winning food preserver. She taught classes on food preservation which included: making jams, jellies and pickles. In 2004, Stasek traveled to Afghanistan to teach Afghan women how to preserve food and generate revenue from home-based businesses.

Rosemary Stasek died at 46 on September 24, 2009 in Kabul, Afghanistan of a heart attack possibly due to complications from multiple sclerosis. Her husband Morne Du Preez survived her.
