= Rosemary Low =

Rosemary Low is a British aviculturist, ornithologist, conservationist, writer and expert on parrots.

Low started her career as a writer for the magazine, Cage and Aviary Birds. At that time, she and her husband had a collection of about 50 parrots. Following their separation she spent nearly eight years in the Canary Islands where she was curator of two major collections of parrots, first at Loro Parque on Tenerife and subsequently at Palmitos Park on Gran Canaria. She served as editor of the PsittaScene Magazine published by the World Parrot Trust until 2004. She has stated that her three main goals are:

“to widely publish information which will lead to a better standard of care for captive birds, to reduce the demand for wild-caught parrots, and to promote and assist with parrot conservation projects.”

== Publications ==
As well as hundreds of articles and scientific papers, books authored or coauthored by Low include:

- 1968 – Aviary Birds. Arco Publications: London.
- 1972 – The Parrots of South America. John Gifford: London. ISBN 0-7071-0063-1
- 1976 – Beginner’s Guide to Birdkeeping. Pelham Books: London. ISBN 0-7207-0673-4
- 1977 – Lories and Lorikeets: the Brush-Tongued Parrots. Paul Elek: London. ISBN 0-236-40102-5
- 1979 – Parrots and cockatoos. (Illustrated by Elizabeth Butterworth, text by Rosemary Low). Fischer Fine Art: London.
- 1980 – Parrots, their care and breeding. Blandford Press: Poole. ISBN 0-7137-0876-X
- 1983 – Amazon parrots: a monograph. (With Elizabeth Butterworth). Rodolphe d'Erlanger/Basilisk Press: London.
- 1984 – Endangered Parrots. Blandford Press: Poole. ISBN 0-7137-1366-6
- 1985 – Keeping Parrots. Blandford Press: Poole. ISBN 0-7137-1695-9
- 1986 – Parrots, their care and breeding. (Revised and enlarged edition). Blandford Press: Poole. ISBN 0-7137-1437-9
- 1986 – The Complete Book of Canaries. (With Ken Denham). Murdoch Books: UK. ISBN 0-948075-02-3
- 1987 – Hand-Rearing Parrots and Other Birds. Blandford Press: Poole. ISBN 0-7137-1901-X
- 1988 – Parrots – a complete guide. Merehurst: London. ISBN 1-85391-023-6
- 1990 – Macaws – a complete guide. Merehurst: London. ISBN 1-85391-072-4
- 1992 – Parrots in Aviculture: A Photo Reference Guide. (With Ron Moat). Mattachione, Silvio, & Company. ISBN 1-895270-11-1
- 1993 – Cockatoos in Aviculture. Blandford Press: Poole. ISBN 0-7137-2322-X
- 1994 – Endangered Parrots. (Revised edition). Blandford Press: Poole. ISBN 0-7137-2356-4
- 1998 – Encyclopedia of the Lories. Hancock House: Blaine, Washington. ISBN 0-88839-413-6
- 1998 – Parrot Breeding. Rob Harvey: Farnham. ISBN 0-9516549-5-0
- 1999 – The Loving Care of Pet Parrots. Hancock House Publishing. ISBN 0-88839-439-X
- 2000 – Why Does My Parrot…? Souvenir Press. ISBN 0-285-63570-0
- 2003 – Fabulous feathers, remarkable birds. Blackie: London. ISBN 1-903138-49-3
- 2003 – Caiques. DONA Publications: Komenskeho. ISBN 80-7322-044-X
- 2005 – Amazon Parrots: Aviculture, Trade and Conservation. Author. ISBN 0-9531337-4-5
- 2006 – A Guide to Grey Parrots As Pet and Aviary Birds. Australian Bird Keeper: Tweed Heads. ISBN 978-0-9750817-6-1
- 2006 – The Parrot Companion. New Holland: London. ISBN 1-84537-463-0
- 2007 – A Century of Parrots. Insignis Publications: Mansfield. ISBN 978-0-9531337-5-8
- 2014 - Understanding Parrots - Cues from nature. INSiGNIS Publications, Mansfield. ISBN 978-0-9531337-9-6
