= Albalá =

Coordinates: 39°15′N 06°11′W

Albalá, Spain
- city
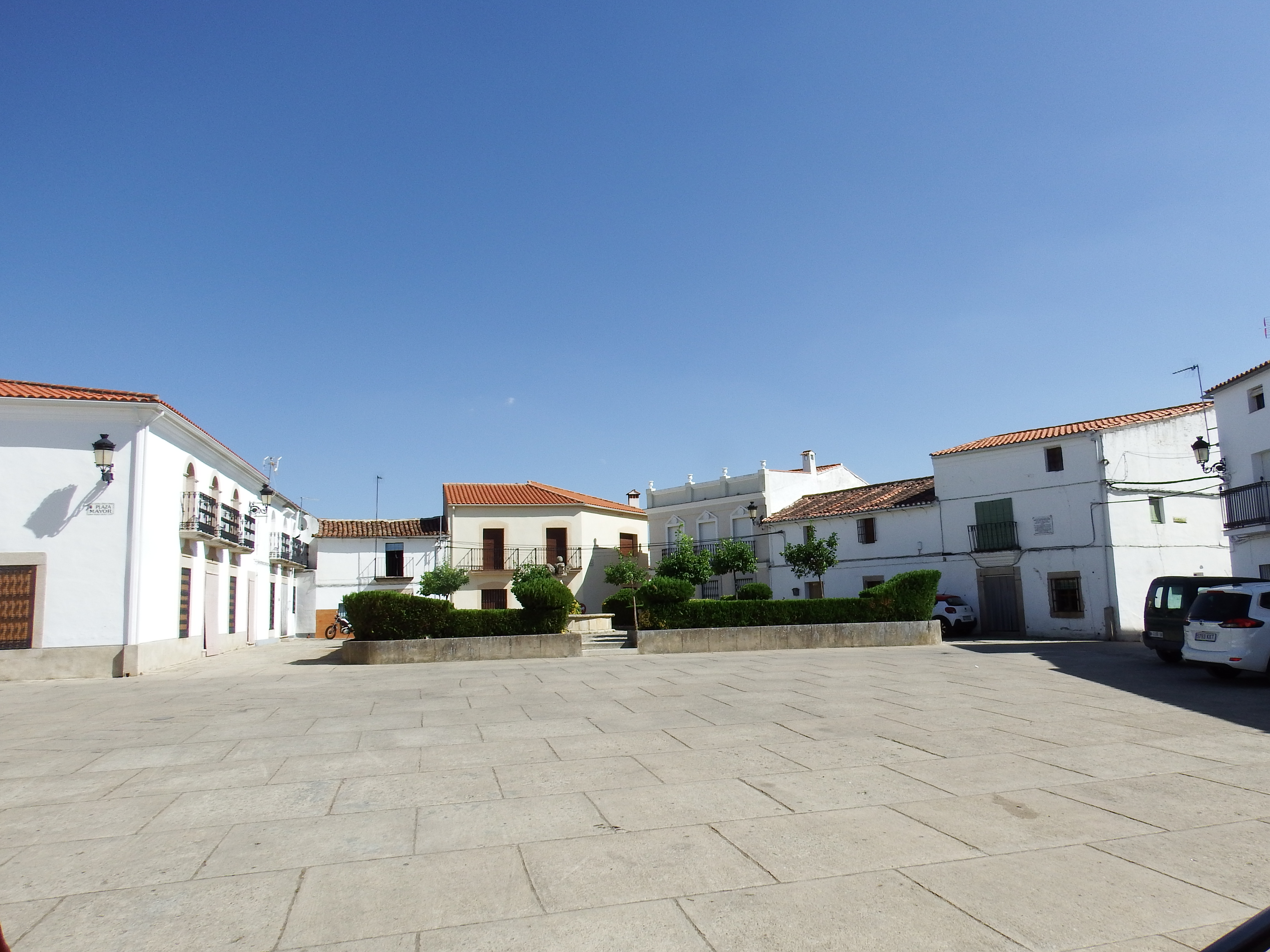
- View of Albalá

- Coat of arms
- Interactive map of Albalá, Spain
- Country: Spain
- Autonomous community: Extremadura
- Province: Cáceres
- Municipality: Albalá

Area
  - Total: 38 km^{2} (15 sq mi)
- Elevation: 502 m (1,647 ft)

Population (2025-01-01)
  - Total: 647
  - Density: 17/km^{2} (44/sq mi)
- Time zone: UTC+1 (CET)
  - Summer (DST): UTC+2 (CEST)

Albalá is a municipality located in the province of Cáceres, Extremadura, Spain, officially Albalá del Caudillo from 1960 until 2001. According to the 2006 census (INE), the municipality has a population of 850 inhabitants.

== See also ==
- List of municipalities in Cáceres
