= Rosemary Sage =

British education professor (active 2000– )

Rosemary Sage is a British professor of education with a focus on communication and special educational needs. She leads the programme for the Practitioner Doctorate (Ed.D.) at the University of Buckingham.

Since 2008, Sage has taught at the College of Teachers (now The Chartered College of Teaching) and served as dean of academic affairs until 2014. She worked at Liverpool Hope University in 2007, where she taught communication in education, and at the University of Leicester, where she was a senior lecturer. She has been a visiting professor at Nara Women's University in Japan and at the University of Havana in Cuba. Sage has been an outside examiner at several universities and has given key speeches at international conferences worldwide. She has published 23 books and over 200 articles in international academic journals.

== Selected publications ==
- The Communication Opportunity Group Scheme (2000)
- Class talk: Successful Learning through Effective Communication (2000)
- Helping Able and Less Able Students to Communicate in School (2002)
- Start Talking and Stop Misbehaving: Emotional and Behavioural Difficulties (2002)
- Lend us your ears: listening and Learning (2003)
- Supporting Learning in Primary schools (2003)
- Silent Children (2004)
- A World of Difference: Tackling Inclusion in Schools (2004)
- The Communication Opportunity Group Scheme: Assessment and Teaching
- Supporting Language and Communication (2006)
- Meeting the Needs of Children with Diverse Backgrounds (2010)
- Education and Change: Education Today (2014)
- Education and Capitalism: Education Today (2014)
