= Rosemary R. Haggett =

American Academic

Rosemary R. Haggett is an American academic who is the Vice Chancellor for Academic Affairs and Student Success for the University of North Texas System. She was the second woman to serve as a dean of a college of agriculture in the U.S.

== Education ==
Haggett earned a bachelor's degree in biology from the University of Bridgeport and a Ph.D. in physiology from the University of Virginia. She conducted postdoctoral work in reproductive biology at Northwestern University.

== Career ==
Haggett began her career as a postdoctoral associate at Northwestern University, conducting research in reproductive biology. She worked at the U.S. Department of Agriculture for several years. In 1994, she became a professor of Animal and Veterinary Sciences and the Dean of the College of Agriculture, Forestry, and Consumer Sciences at West Virginia University, only the second woman in the U.S. to serve in such a position. In 1999, she became the Associate Provost for Academic Programs at West Virginia University.

In 2003, she left West Virginia University to serve at the National Science Foundation as the director of the Division of Undergraduate Education. She also served as the Acting Deputy Assistant Director of the Education and Human Resources Directorate, the Acting Director of the Division of Graduate Education, and the Senior Adviser of the Education and Human Resources Directorate at the National Science Foundation.

In 2007, she became Provost and Executive Vice President for Academic Affairs at the University of Toledo.

In 2010, she became Vice Chancellor for Academic Affairs and Student Success for the University of North Texas System.

Haggett served as Chair of the Committee of Visitors for the National Science Foundation's Training Cluster in the Division of Biological Infrastructure in 2003. She served on the National Academies Committee to review the USDA Agricultural and Food Research Initiative in 2012.
