= David Albala =

Serbian military officer, physician, diplomat and Zionist leader

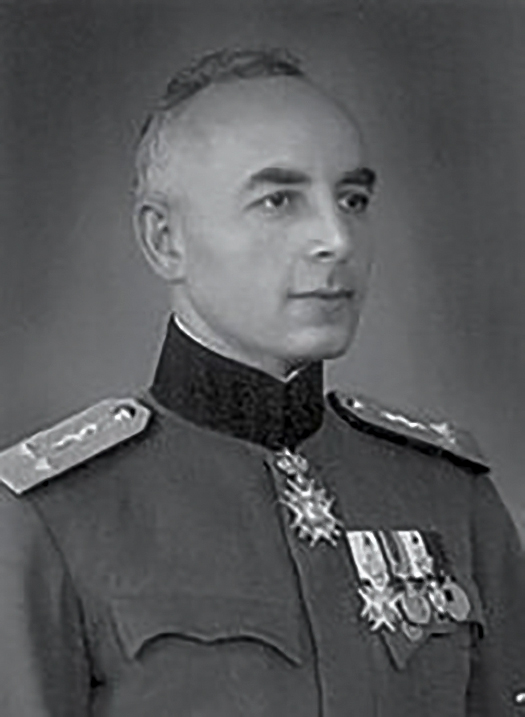
- David Albala c. 1939
- Born: David Kovu; 1 September 1886; Belgrade, Kingdom of Serbia
- Died: 4 April 1942 (aged 55); Washington, D.C., United States
- Education: University of Vienna
- Occupations: Military officer, physician, diplomat and Jewish community leader
- Military career
- Allegiance: Kingdom of Serbia; Kingdom of Yugoslavia
- Branch: Royal Yugoslav Army; Royal Yugoslav Air Force
- Rank: Captain
- Conflicts: Balkan Wars; World War I

David Albala (Note: Serbian Cyrillic: Давид Албала) (born David Kovu; (Note: Serbian Cyrillic: Давид Кову) 1 September 1886 – 4 April 1942) was a Serbian military officer, physician, diplomat and Jewish community leader.

In 1905, Albala enrolled at the University of Vienna to study medicine. He returned to Serbia following the outbreak of the Balkan Wars in 1912 and enlisted in the Royal Serbian Army. In late 1915, Albala took part in the Royal Serbian Army's arduous winter retreat to the Greek island of Corfu, during which he contracted typhoid, and was subsequently evacuated to North Africa. Upon recovering, Albala returned to Corfu, where he proposed to Serbian Prime Minister Nikola Pašić that he travel to United States to lobby on Serbia's behalf. Pašić agreed to the proposal and Albala embarked on a tour of the United States giving speeches, raising bonds and soliciting loans. On 27 December 1917, the head of the Serbian delegation to the United States, Milenko Vesnić, sent Albala a letter in which he affirmed Serbia's support for the creation of a Jewish state in Palestine. Serbia thus became the first country to endorse the Balfour Declaration.

In the immediate post-war period, Albala served as one of the Kingdom of Serbs, Croats and Slovenes' representatives at the Paris Peace Conference in Versailles. Following a dispute with Pašić and his People's Radical Party, Albala reoriented his focus towards civic activism. He served as the president of the Jewish Community of Belgrade, vice-president of the Council of Jewish Communities of Yugoslavia and president of Yugoslavia's Jewish National Fund. In 1935, he visited the Holy Land for the first and only time to attend the dedication of a memorial forest in Jerusalem planted in honour of Yugoslavia's King Alexander, who had been assassinated the previous year.

As the 1930s progressed, Albala became increasingly concerned about the precarious position of Jews in Central and Eastern Europe, but his concerns were ignored by many other prominent Yugoslav Jews. In 1939, Albala departed for the United States on another mission to raise funds and lobby American officials on Yugoslavia's behalf. He died of a brain aneurysm in Washington, D.C., in 1942, never having returned to Yugoslavia, which had in the interim been invaded, occupied and partitioned by the Axis powers.

== Early life ==
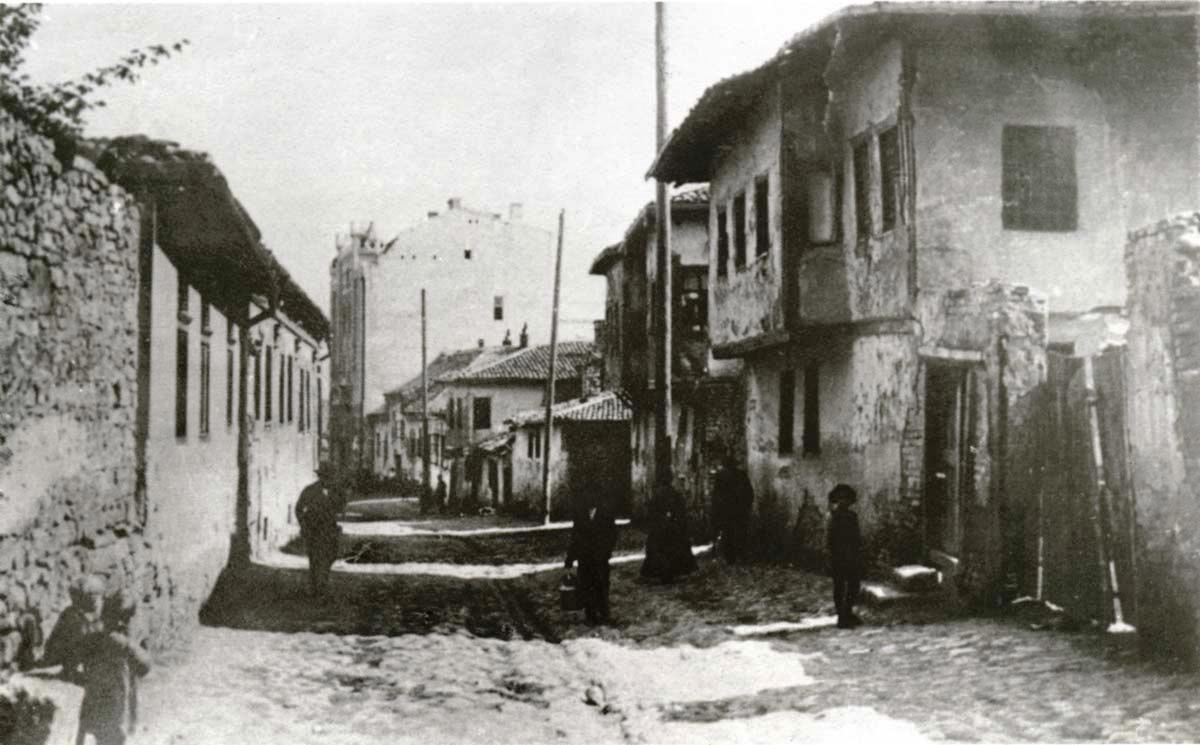
Dorćol, Belgrade's Jewish quarter

David Kovu was born in Belgrade, Serbia on 1 September 1886. He was one of seven children born to Avram Kovu and Lea Malamed, Sephardic Jews who had lived in the Romanian towns of Craiova and Drobeta-Turnu Severin before relocating to Serbia and settling in its capital Belgrade prior to David's birth. The family was relatively impoverished. Following the deaths of both of their parents, the Kovu children were placed in the care of seven different families. Two of Albala's brothers were adopted by families in the United States. At the age of five, David was adopted by his maternal aunt and her husband Isak Albala, whose surname he assumed. Isak traced his heritage to a noble family in first-century Judea. One of his distant ancestors was the 12th-century Spanish Jewish astronomer Abraham ibn Daud. Albala and his adopted family lived in Belgrade's Jewish quarter, Dorćol.

Albala completed his primary education in Belgrade. He later attended the First Belgrade Gymnasium. Albala's wife, Paulina, who wrote her husband's biography, stated: "These schools provided David and his generation with something more than just knowledge: this was the unique and intensive feeling of patriotism, a special love for Belgrade, and the ideals Belgrade stood for." In 1903, Albala founded Gideon, Belgrade' first Jewish youth association. Albala was an ambitious student who aspired to enroll in the University of Vienna. He received a scholarship from Potpora, a Jewish benevolent society headquartered in Belgrade. Further financial support was provided by several prominent members of Belgrade's Jewish community. In 1905, Albala enrolled in the University of Vienna's Faculty of Medicine. The University of Vienna facilitated contact and cultural exchange between Sephardim from the Balkans and Ashkenazim from Central Europe. While studying medicine, Albala first became introduced to Zionism. He subsequently joined the Balkan Jewish students association of Bar Giora, and later became its president. He graduated from the University of Vienna in 1910.

Upon his return to Serbia, Albala was conscripted into the Royal Serbian Army. During this time, he found himself attending synagogue less often. Asked by his adopted father about this change, Albala asserted, "But I am a devoted Zionist." The father replied, "Ah, my son, one must be a Jew as well as a Zionist," which influenced Albala's behaviour thereafter. Albala was later employed as a physician aboard an ocean liner sailing from Trieste to South America. Upon hearing of the outbreak of the Balkan Wars in October 1912, Albala tendered his resignation and returned to Serbia to enlist. For the duration of the Balkan Wars, Albala served in a Royal Serbian Army field hospital, during which he contracted typhus and cholera. In the post-war period, Albala was demobilized and assigned as a physician in the town of Monastir (modern-day Bitola, North Macedonia). His superiors quickly took note of his charisma and affinity for language. In November 1913, Albala and the chief rabbi of Belgrade, Isak Alkalaj, were enlisted by the Royal Serbian Government to travel through the territories recently wrested from the Ottoman Empire and deliver pro-Serbian speeches to the Jews living there.

== World War I ==
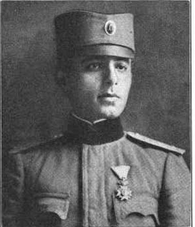
David Albala as a captain in the Royal Serbian Army

In late 1915 and early 1916, Albala took part in the Royal Serbian Army's winter retreat to Corfu across the mountains of Albania. During the retreat, Albala contracted typhoid, and was evacuated together with other ailing soldiers to the Greek port of Volos, and then to the town of Bizerte, in French Tunisia. He was later transferred to a hospital in Cairo, where he perfected his English-language skills by conversing with his fellow patients and the English-speaking nurses. Upon recovery, he returned to Corfu, where Serbia had established its government-in-exile.

=== First mission to the United States ===
As a consequence of the Russian Revolution, the Russian Empire – one of Serbia's principal allies – was no longer able to offer its support. Worsening matters further, the other Allied countries were hesitant to provide further aid to the Royal Serbian Army on the Salonika front. The Royal Serbian Government decided to turn to the United States, a neutral country at the time, for financial assistance. A mission headed by Bishop Nikolaj Velimirović two years earlier to garner support for the Serbian war effort had been unsuccessful. The Royal Serbian Army needed to replenish its depleted ranks, but for much of the war, it was illegal for Serbian representatives to recruit volunteers on American soil because most Serbian Americans were still subjects of Austria-Hungary, a country the United States was not formally at war with. (Note: The United States declared war on Germany on 6 April 1917. It would not declare war on Austria-Hungary until 17 December 1917.)

The Serbian government's lobbying efforts centred around two organizations, the Serbian National Defence and the Yugoslav Committee. The latter was intended to attract the support of Croats and Slovenes for the creation of a unified South Slavic state after the war. In January 1917, Serbia established a diplomatic legation in Washington, D.C. Shortly thereafter, the Serbian War Mission was established, headed by Milenko Vesnić. At Corfu, Albala approached the Prime Minister of Serbia, Nikola Pašić, with a proposal to visit the United States and lobby Jewish Americans on the Serbian government's behalf; Pašić accepted Albala's proposal. In July 1917, Albala left Corfu, and after brief stopovers in Rome and Paris, reached London in September. He arrived in the United States on 26 September 1917.

Albala's tour of the United States was financed by several Jewish organizations. He formed relationships with several prominent members of the Jewish American community, among them Louis Brandeis, an associate Supreme Court justice, as well as Felix Frankfurter, one of president Woodrow Wilson's closest advisors. These connections gave Albala access to several senior Wilson administration officials, such as Secretary of State Robert Lansing and his counselor Frank Polk.

==== Balfour Declaration ====
In November 1917, the Parliament of the United Kingdom adopted the Balfour Declaration, which called for the establishment of a Jewish homeland in Palestine. Albala immediately drew the attention of the Royal Serbian Government to the document's significance and recommended that it consider officially endorsing it. On 17 December 1917, Vesnić sent a letter to Albala expressing the Royal Serbian Government's support for the establishment of a Jewish state in Palestine. The letter, written in English, was soon published in all major American newspapers, it read as follows:

Dear Captain Albala, I learn that you have to attend on Saturday 19th ... a meeting of the Menorah, the great Cultural Society in this country of the Jewish youth. I wish you to express to your Jewish brothers on that occasion the sympathy of our Government and of our people for the just endeavor of resuscitating their beloved country in Palestine, which will enable them to take their place in the future Society of Nations, according to their numerous capacities and to their unquestioned right. We are sure that this will not only be to their own interest, but at the same time to that of the whole of humanity.

You know, dear Captain Albala, that there is no other nation in the world sympathizing with this plan more than Serbia. Do we not shed bitter tears on the rivers of Babylon in sight of our beloved land, lost only a short time ago? How should we not participate in your clamors and sorrows, lasting ages and generations, especially when our countrymen of your origin and religion have fought for their Serbian fatherland as well as the best of our soldiers?

It will be a sad thing for us to see any of our fellow citizens leave us to return to their promised land, but we shall console ourselves in the hope that they will stand as brethren and leave with us a good part of their hearts, and that they will be the strongest tie between free Israel and Serbia.

Believe me, dear Captain Albala,

Very sincerely yours,

—Vesnitch

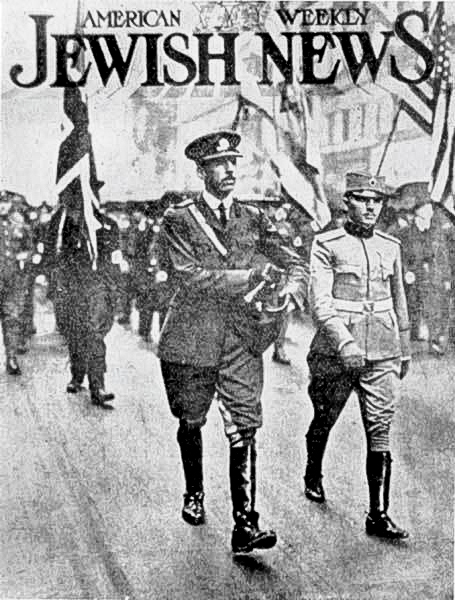
Serbian captain David Albala (right) leading the 1st Jewish Brigade down Fifth Avenue, New York, c. 1918

Serbia thus became the first country to openly endorse the Balfour Declaration. Unlike the Balfour Declaration, which called for the establishment of a Jewish "national home" in Palestine, Vesnić's letter unambiguously called for the establishment of a state that would become an integral member of the international community, as demonstrated by the use of the term "free Israel" in its latter half. Vesnić's letter also marked the first time that Israel was mentioned in any official government document as the name of the future Jewish state. Albala himself considered Vesnić's letter to be the ultimate goal of his political work, both Serbian and Jewish; with its publication, he achieved three successes: he won American public opinion by exposing Serbia as tolerant, broad-minded and democratic, he received expressions of sympathy from Serbia for Jews, as well as for Serbian Jews, and he received support for the Zionist idea.

Albala subsequently toured the United States addressing Jewish communities and raising money for war bonds. After the head of the Serbian legation, Ljubomir Mihailović, failed to secure a loan from the United States, Albala appealed to Brandeis, who persuaded Wilson to approve a loan of $1 million ($16.1 million in 2026) to Serbia. Albala proposed forming a Jewish Brigade made up of Jewish American volunteers, on the model of the British Army's Jewish Legion, to take part in combat operations in Palestine. The brigade was eventually formed in March 1918, (Note: In all 2,700 American Jewish volunteers were enrolled in three battalions, the American volunteers did not see action in Palestine, for they arrived when the war had already ended.) in a ceremonial parade, the 1st Jewish Brigade was led by US Major Weiss and David Albala down New York's Fifth Avenue, before setting out for Palestine.

== Interwar period ==
=== Immediate post-war years (1918–1929) ===
It is also stated that Albala stood in the United States until November 1918. On his return to Serbia, Albala was asked by Pašić to attend the Paris Peace Conference as an observer and expert on Jewish matters. In the immediate post-war period, Albala was briefly associated with Pašić's People's Radical Party, but soon withdrew from the political scene altogether to focus on his medical career and civic activism.

Albala became prominent in the Belgrade Jewish Nationalist Society and in the Yugoslav Zionist Federation. He was the founder or co-founder of several Jewish organizations, among them the Jewish National Fund of Yugoslavia, where he served as a long-time president, the Yugoslav branch of Keren Hayesod, the Jewish Reading Room, and the theatrical association Max Nordau. He founded and co-founded several Jewish periodicals, which he edited or co-edited: The Jewish News-Letter, The Review of the Union of Jewish Religious Communities and The Newsletter of the Jewish Sephardic Religious Community. Albala wrote and published articles in various journals, both Jewish and non-Jewish, and even wrote two plays. Albala also served as the vice-president of the Federation of Jewish Religious Communities of Yugoslavia.

=== Prelude to World War II (1930–1939) ===
In 1930, Albala published an article titled Why the Jews Love Yugoslavia in the publication Jevrejski glas (Jewish Voice), in which he repeated the phrase "we love it" eleven times. "We love it because its joy is our joy," Albala wrote, "its pain is our pain, its enemies are our enemies, its desires are our desires." Following the assassination of King Alexander of Yugoslavia in October 1934, the Jewish community of Mandatory Palestine planted a forest in his memory. In 1935, Albala was invited to attend its opening ceremony. Albala accepted the invitation and his subsequent visit marked his first and only stay in the Holy Land. The Royal Yugoslav Government subsequently honoured Albala, as well as four other Yugoslav Jews, for their roles in the planting of the forest.

By the mid-1930s, the political climate in Yugoslavia had changed, and anti-Semitism became more palpable. "It is difficult to be a Jew in Yugoslavia," Albala wrote in 1936, in stark contrast to his optimistic tone from several years earlier. "I wish many non-Jews could be Jews for only twenty-four hours and feel all the tragedy of our position, feel what it is like when people turn their heads and eyes from a Jew, when conversation dies down as soon as a person discovers that he is talking to a Jew." In 1936, Albala became the first chairman of Bratstvo, a debating circle which attracted dozens of young Jewish intellectuals to discuss matters of interest to the Jewish community.

Several days after the Sixth Congress of the Union of Jewish Communities of Yugoslavia (Serbo-Croatian: Savez jevrejskih vjeroispovjednih općina Jugoslavije; SJVOJ), Albala met with Prime Minister Milan Stojadinović, and complained to him about the rising level of anti-Semitism in the Yugoslav press. According to Albala, Stojadinović "expressed his clear disapproval" of anti-Semitism and stated that he would take steps to address the issue. Several weeks later, Albala was granted an audience with prince regent Paul, who was reported to have expressed sympathy with the Jewish people. Despite this, the Yugoslav government continued to relax its attitude towards the far-right, in accordance with Yugoslavia's policy of appeasing Germany in the lead-up to World War II. In May 1938, Albala held a meeting with Yugoslavia's Minister of Internal Affairs, Anton Korošec, who assured Albala that Yugoslavia would not implement German-style race laws targeting Jews.

Albala was the last president of the Belgrade Sephardic community before World War II. In February 1939, a SJVOJ delegation consisting of Albala, Fridrih Pops and Šime Spitzer held a meeting with Prime Minister Dragiša Cvetković, who had recently provoked unease in the Jewish community by remarking that Yugoslavia would not implement laws targeting Jews "as long as the Jews continue to provide proof of their loyalty." At the meeting, Cvetković expressed sympathy for the plight of the Jewish people and told the SJVOJ representatives that they had no reason to be concerned. At the Seventh Congress of the SJVOJ, held between 23 and 24 April 1939, Albala delivered a speech in which he extolled the nascent Jewish community in Mandatory Palestine as a refuge for the Jewish people.

== Second mission to the United States ==
=== Departure ===
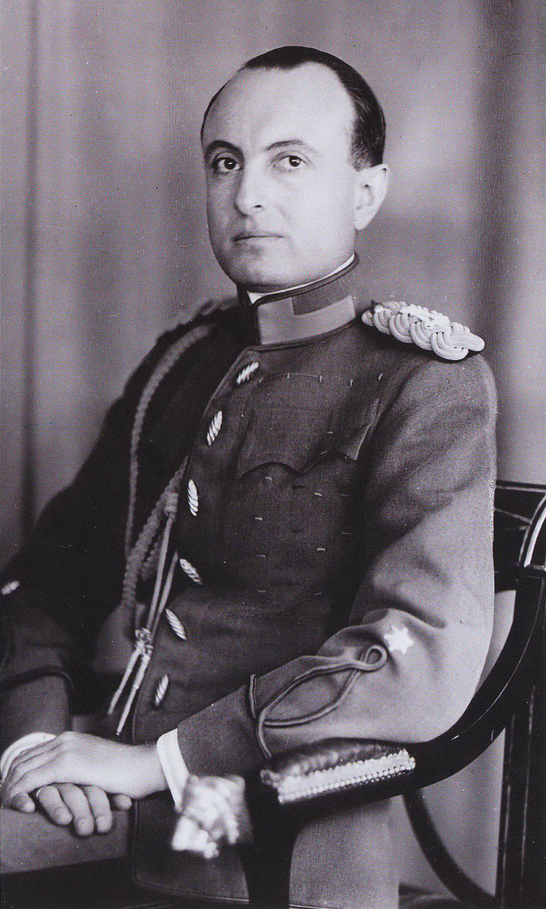
Albala was dispatched to the United States by Prince Paul of Yugoslavia

Prince Paul believed the only way to counter German pressure on Yugoslavia was by uniting with Bulgaria. In 1939, Prince Paul dispatched Albala on another public relations and fundraising trip to the United States. Since this was a confidential mission, Albala left Yugoslavia without informing Alkalay or the other members of the committee. He arrived in New York on 23 December 1939. Albala sent Alkalay a letter explaining that he had departed for the United States and requesting that Alkalay devise an excuse for his absence before the committee. When Albala's wife and daughter Jelena joined him in the United States, Albala's departure from the country became widely known. Albala thus sent Alkalay a letter of resignation, which was read aloud before the committee. In the letter, Albala expressed concern about the political climate in Europe, and warned the members of the committee, "you are sitting on a volcano." This line prompted laughter among the members, who viewed Yugoslavia as a bastion of stability.

Albala soon learned that neither the American nor British governments viewed the concept of a Bulgarian–Yugoslav federation as a realistic or viable solution. During his stay in Washington, Albala worked closely with the Yugoslav ambassador to the United States, Konstantin Fotić. Between 1 February 1940 and 8 February 1941, Albala sent twelve reports to Prince Paul and Yugoslavia's Ministry of Foreign Affairs. In stark contrast to his first mission to the United States, Albala found that the majority of Americans favoured isolationism, a stance which made the task of lobbying on Yugoslavia's behalf all the more difficult. Moreover, most Americans that Albala spoke with, as well as many American Jews, failed to grasp the severity of the situation in Europe and the extent of the unfolding Holocaust.

=== Invasion of Yugoslavia and the Holocaust ===
On 6 April 1941, Germany, Italy and Hungary invaded Yugoslavia. The country quickly capitulated and its royal family was forced to flee together with its government. It was subsequently occupied and divided into several puppet states. Serbia was placed under direct German military occupation, whereas most of the country's west became part of the Independent State of Croatia (Croatian: Nezavisna Država Hrvatska; NDH), an Italo–German puppet state led by Ante Pavelić and the fascist Ustaše movement. The NDH soon launched a campaign of massacres, expulsions and forced religious conversions targeting its sizeable Serb and Jewish populations. Two resistance movements, the National Liberation Movement and the Yugoslav Army in the Fatherland, soon emerged, but were divided along ideological lines, with the latter pledging loyalty to Yugoslavia's exiled monarchy and the former adhering to communism.

Albala wrote two reports informing the Yugoslav government-in-exile about the extermination of Jews in the NDH. The first was dated 18 October 1941 and was based on the eyewitness testimony of Yugoslav Jews recently arrived in New York. On 10 November 1941, Albala wrote a second report, addressed to Subašić and Fotić, describing the extent of the Holocaust in Croatia. This report was based on the testimony of a Croatian Jew who was smuggled out of Europe by an unnamed gentile. It was one of the first reports documenting the atrocities committed by the Ustaše at Jasenovac. Around the same time, Albala sent letters to representatives of the Roman Catholic Church imploring Pope Pius XII to demand an end to the extermination of Jews in the NDH. Albala also sent letters to the World Jewish Congress and the American Jewish Congress keeping them informed of the situation in the NDH, as well as a letter to U.S. President Franklin D. Roosevelt warning him of the dangers of an Axis victory in Europe. Albala also sent letters to Jewish representatives in Switzerland, requesting that they send aid to the Jews in the NDH.

Albala worked so closely with the Yugoslav embassy in Washington, the scholar Krinka Vidaković-Petrov writes, that he was practically a member of the embassy staff. Albala concerned himself with the treatment of Yugoslav prisoners of war in Germany and drafted lists of supplies that could be sent to them through the Red Cross. In a letter dated 17 November 1941, Albala advised Paulina's family, who had fled to Italian-occupied Split, to instead relocate to Rome, which Albala considered a safer alternative.

=== Death and legacy ===
Albala died in Washington, D.C. of a sudden brain aneurysm on 4 April 1942. He was said to have died of a "broken heart" upon hearing of the extent of the destruction inflicted on Yugoslavia's Jewish communities during the Holocaust. His death spawned rumours that he had been poisoned. On 5 April, Fotić sent a telegram to London informing the Yugoslav government-in-exile of Albala's death and requesting that it wire the money required to cover his funeral expenses.

Albala's body was cremated on 6 April 1942, on the anniversary of the German bombing of Belgrade and the beginning of the Axis aggression on Yugoslavia; the ceremony took place in the presence of members of the Yugoslav embassy as well as representatives of Jewish organizations in Washington. A condolence letter written by Sumner Welles, the United States Under Secretary of State, was received by Fotić on 25 April. Albala's death dealt a heavy blow to the diplomatic efforts of Yugoslav officials in the United States. The Yugoslav government-in-exile approved a pension for Albala's widow and a stipend for his daughter. Albala's widow continued to work for the Yugoslav government-in-exile's propaganda section in New York City until May 1943. After the war, Albala's ashes were transferred to Belgrade.

Albala is the grandfather of Wikipedia editor Rosie Stephenson-Goodknight.
