= Rosemary Joy Hendry =

British cultural anthropologist

Rosemary Joy Hendry (born 1945) is a British cultural anthropologist. Born in the city of Birmingham, she completed a Bachelor of Science degree from King's College in 1966, and a Bachelor of Letters (BLitt) degree at Lady Margaret Hall at the University of Oxford in 1974. She was awarded a Doctor of Philosophy (DPhil) degree from the same institution in 1979. She conducted much of her early research in Japan. Initially studying family and marriage in the rural community of Kyushu, she later moved to studying rearing practices for children before pre-school both in Kyushu and in a seaside community near Tokyo, and then to examining self-presentation and politeness in language. She later began a project studying diplomacy, with the involvement of British and Japanese diplomats and the British Foreign Office. Beginning in 1975, her work in Japan continued till at least 2004. She has also worked in several other countries, including Indonesia, Nepal, Thailand, and Tanzania, where she worked on applying a comparative approach to her work in Japan. At some point she served as a principal lecturer at Oxford University.
