= Rosemary Hughes =

Rosemary "Rosie" Hughes, NDSF, AIFD, GCGI, was the royal florist of Queen Elizabeth II, based in Hamilton, Leicester.

== Biography ==
Having worked in the floral industry for over 40 years, she has represented the UK in various floral competitions, gaining her American Institute of Floral Designers qualification and also taking part in many Chelsea Flower Shows. She has also received a number of awards and worked in France, the United States, Germany and other countries. In 2011 she was co-organiser of the World Flower Council summit held in London, organising a floral team to produce exclusive designs for this event.

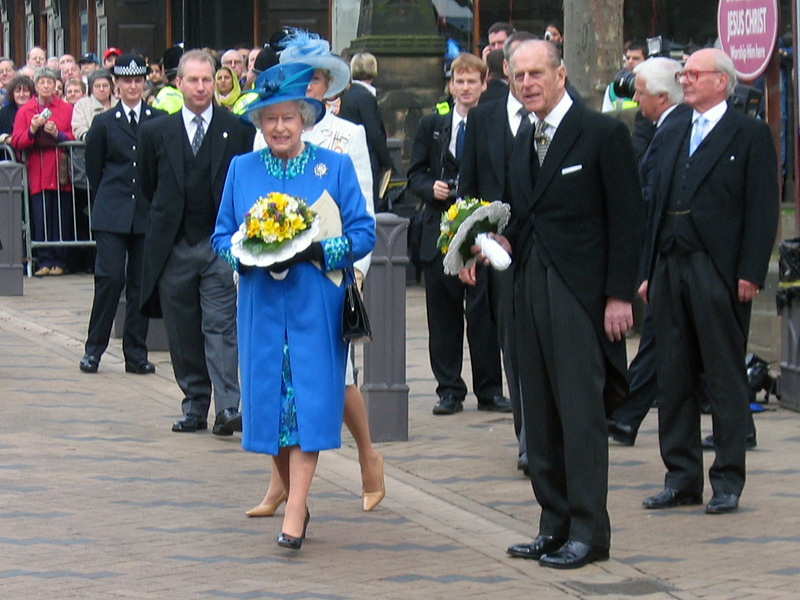
Queen Elizabeth II (centre, in blue) and Prince Philip hold nosegays by Rosie Hughes as they leave Wakefield Cathedral after the Royal Maundy (in 2005)

She works as a freelance designer and consultant. She has been granted a Royal Warrant of Appointment from the Queen as Nosegay maker for Royal Maundy since 2008.
