= Rosita (given name) =

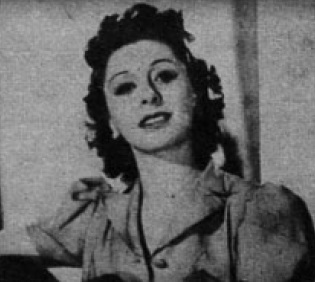
Portrait of Rosita Serrano

Rosita or Rozita is a feminine given name. Notable people with the name include:

- Rosita Amores, Spanish singer and burlesque performer
- Rosita Arenas (born 1933), Mexican actress
- Rosita Baltazar (1960–2015), Belizean choreographer, dancer, dance instructor and director
- Rosita Bradborn (born 1973), Filipino lawn bowler
- Rosita Contreras (1913–1962), Argentine actress, singer and vedette
- Rosita Fernández (1918–2006), American singer, humanitarian, and actress
- Rosita Forbes (1890–1967), English travel writer and explorer
- Rosita van Gijlswijk (born 1974), Dutch politician
- Rosita Díaz Gimeno (1908–1986), Spanish actress
- Rosita Marstini (1887–1948), French-American actress and dancer
- Rosita Melo (1897–1981), Argentine-Uruguayan pianist, composer and poet
- Rosita Beatrice Missick-Butterfield (1936–2015), Turks and Caicos Islands politician
- Rosita Missoni (1931–2025), Italian knitwear designer
- Rosita Moreno (1907–1993), Spanish actress
- Rosita Quintana (1925–2021), Argentina-Mexican actress and singer
- Rosita Quiroga (1896–1984), Argentine singer, lyricist and composer
- Rosita Fornés (1923–2020), Cuban singer and actress
- Rosita Runegrund (born 1947), Swedish politician
- Rosita Serrano (1914–1997), Chilean singer
- Rosita Sokou (1923–2021), Greek journalist, author and translator
- Rosita Vai (born 1981), New Zealand singer
- Rosita Worl (born 1938), American anthropologist
- Rosita Yarza (1922–1996), Spanish actress
- Rosita Youngblood (born 1946), American politician

== Fictional characters ==
- Rosita, one of the main characters from the film Sing
- Rosita, one of the main characters from the TV show Sesame Street

== See also ==
- Rosa (given name)
- Rosie (given name)
