= Reseda =

Reseda may refer to:

== In natural science ==
- Reseda (plant), a plant genus also known as mignonette
- 1081 Reseda, a minor planet that orbits the Sun; named for the Reseda plant genus

== Places ==
- Reseda, Los Angeles, a neighborhood in the San Fernando Valley of Southern California
  - Reseda Boulevard, a north–south street in western San Fernando Valley; passes through the Reseda neighborhood
    - Reseda (Los Angeles Metro station), a station on the Orange Line of the LACMTA rail transportation system; named for Reseda Boulevard

== Colours ==
- Reseda green, a shade of greyish green
