= Rosemary Pattenden =

Rosemary Pattenden is emeritus professor at UEA Law School. She took the degrees of bachelor of commerce and bachelor of laws at the University of New South Wales and doctor of philosophy (DPhil) at the University of Oxford. On the completion of her DPhil in 1979 she joined the University of East Anglia where she was lecturer, senior lecturer, reader and, between 1998 and 2013, professor.

== Bibliography ==
- Judicial Discretion and Criminal Litigation (2nd edn OUP Oxford 1990)
- English Criminal Appeals 1844-1994 (OUP Oxford 1996)
- The Law of Professional-Client Confidentiality: Regulating the Disclosure of Confidential Personal Information (OUP Oxford 2003)
- The Law of Professional-Client Confidentiality: Regulating the Disclosure of Confidential Information 2e (OUP Oxford 2016) (with Duncan Sheehan et al)
- Phipson on Evidence 18th edn. ed. H. Malek (Sweet & Maxwell London 2013) (chapters 28, 30, 31, 32, 41)
