= Rosie Stephenson-Goodknight =

American Wikipedia editor (born 1953)

Dame Rosie Stephenson-Goodknight
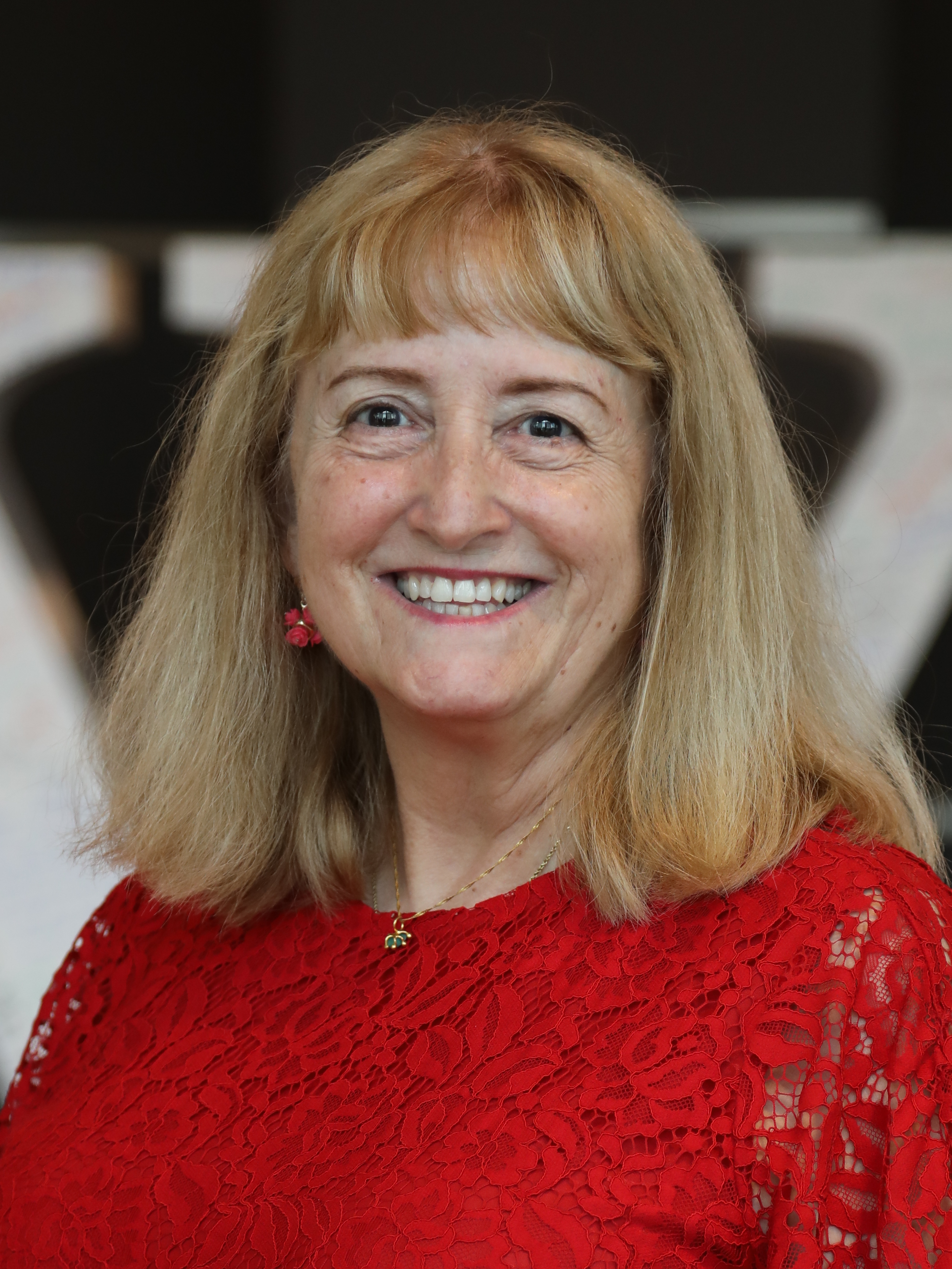
- Stephenson-Goodknight at Wikimania 2023
- Born: Rose Gojich; December 5, 1953 (age 72); Gary, Indiana, U.S.
- Other name: Rosiestep
- Education: California State University, University of California, San Diego, University of California, Irvine, University of California, Los Angeles
- Occupation: Business administrator
- Known for: Wikipedia editor
- Children: 2
- Relatives: David Albala (grandfather); Paulina Lebl-Albala (grandmother)
- Awards: Wikipedian of the Year (2016)
- Stephenson-Goodknight's voice Recorded July 2018

Dame Rosie Gojich Stephenson-Goodknight (born December 5, 1953) is an American Wikipedia editor, known on the site under the pseudonym Rosiestep, who is noted for her actions addressing gender bias in the encyclopedia by running a project to increase the quantity and quality of women's biographies. She has contributed thousands of new articles.

Stephenson was named co-Wikipedian of the Year in 2016. In May 2018, she was honored with a Serbian knighthood as a Dame of the St. Sava Order of Diplomatic Pacifism. She was elected to a three-year term on the Wikimedia Foundation Board of Trustees in October 2021.

== Early life and education ==
Stephenson-Goodknight is of Serbian descent. She is the granddaughter of Paulina Lebl-Albala, an active feminist who was the president of the University Women of Yugoslavia. David Albala, her grandfather, was a physician and Zionist leader, who served for a period as president of Belgrade's Sephardi community. At a young age, she displayed a keen interest in world culture, but was discouraged by her father from pursuit of a career in anthropology; instead she completed a Master of Business Administration degree.

== Wikipedia editing ==
Stephenson-Goodknight began editing Wikipedia in 2007. Her son had edited an article about a town in Ukraine where he was working with the Peace Corps, and told his mother that Wikipedia can be edited by anybody. She began editing later that year when she looked for books published by the Book League of America and found a gap in the site's knowledge resources. She found the encyclopedia to be a suitable outlet for anthropology, citing Margaret Mead as an influence:

Some of you know that I am a cultural anthropologist at heart. I wanted to follow in the footsteps of Margaret Mead and study cultural anthropology at Barnard (my mom's alma mater), like Margaret did. I wanted to travel to Papua New Guinea and do research on its people, like Margaret did. But my dad said 'no' to majoring in anthropology—he wanted something more practical for my university studies. So now, years later, I get to live the life of an armchair cultural anthropologist, writing articles about Goaribari Island and its cannibals. To all the girls out there with impractical dreams, this article is dedicated to you.

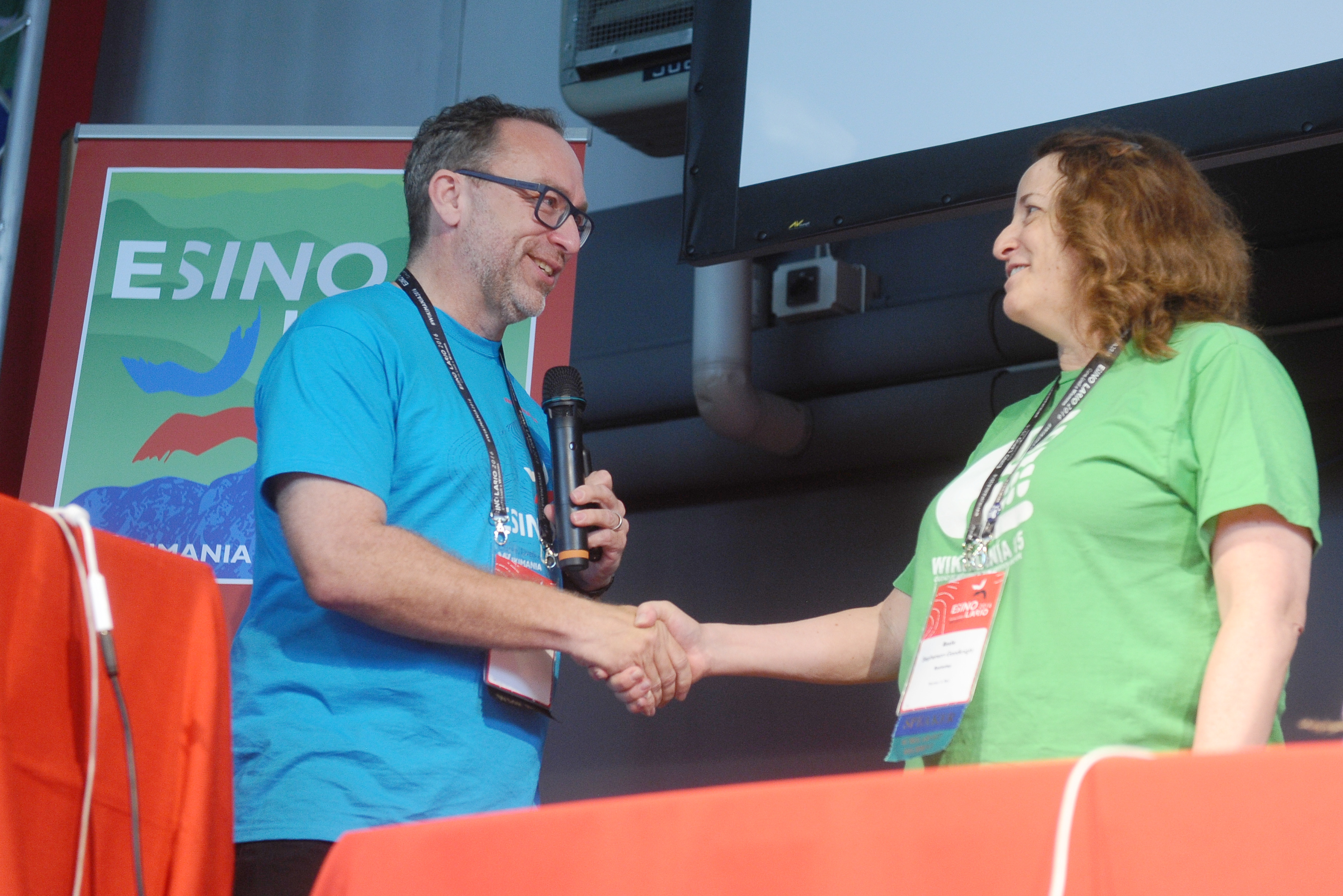
Stephenson-Goodknight at Wikimania 2016 with Wikipedia founder Jimmy Wales

Stephenson-Goodknight worked at creating articles on geography, architecture and various biographies for several years, but has more recently concentrated on women's biographies. By 2013, Stephenson-Goodknight was featured in the UK Huffington Post for having written over 3,000 new articles for Wikipedia, and at that time, over 1000 articles of hers had appeared at the "Did you know?" feature on Wikipedia's main page; she was the first woman to have over 1000 "Did you know?" entries on the English language version of Wikipedia. As of 2016 she has created over 4,000 new articles, (Note: Total excludes redirects "Pages Created". WMFlabs. Archived from the original on February 12, 2017.) and has made over 100,000 edits. The 2016 Wikipedian of the Year awards, granted by Wikipedia trustee Jimmy Wales in recognition of outstanding achievement, named Stephenson-Goodknight as a winner, sharing the award jointly with fellow editor Emily Temple-Wood. At the time of the award, it was noted that over 1,300 of her articles have appeared on Wikipedia's "Did you know?". She also co-founded WikiProject Women, WikiProject Women writers, and Women in Red. These projects have increased Wikipedia's percentage of articles on women from 15.5% to 16.35%. She has taken part in related projects such as the Art+Feminism Wikipedia Edit-A-Thon in April 2016.

Stephenson-Goodknight believes there is information to write stronger biographies, provided people are prepared to search for it. She also suggests it is possible for women to contribute greatly to Wikipedia, explaining, "What Wikipedia needs is you, the female editor, with your unique aptitudes and interests and talkpage tone. Without you, gender imbalance and systemic bias continue on Wikipedia."

On January 23, 2020, Wikipedia announced that Stephenson-Goodknight was the creator of the 6,000,000th article on Wikipedia, namely the article on Canadian author Maria Elise Turner Lauder.

== Awards and distinctions ==
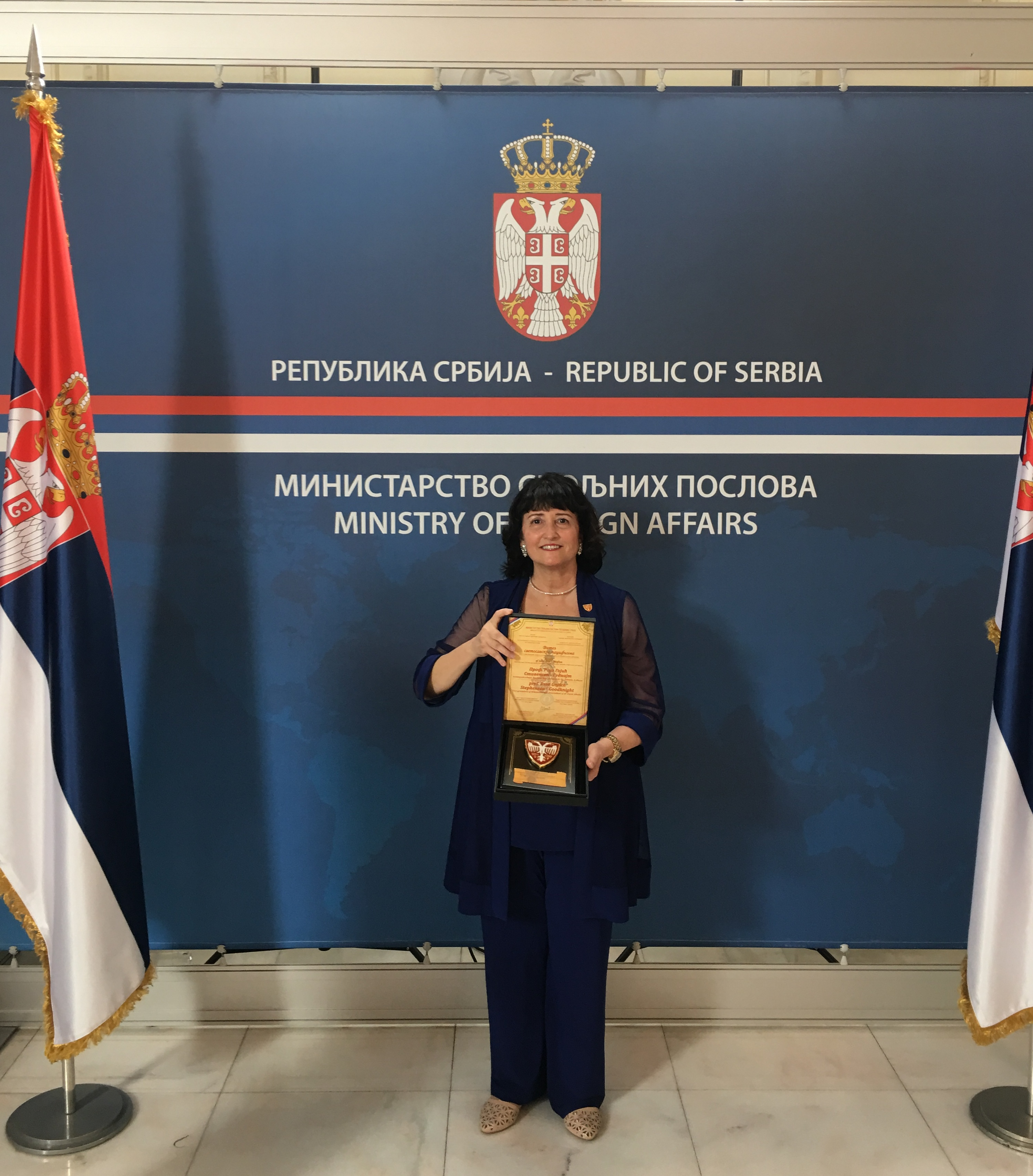
Elevation of Stephenson-Goodknight to a Dame of the St. Sava Order of Diplomatic Pacifism, May 2018

On December 14, 2017, Goodknight was the "honored guest" at an event hosted by Israel's ambassador to Serbia, Alona Fisher-Kamm, to commemorate 25 years of diplomatic relations between Serbia and Israel.

On May 29, 2018, in a ceremony conferring honors on those who deserved high diplomatic recognition, Stephenson-Goodknight was appointed a "Dame of the St. Sava Order of Diplomatic Pacifism" (Vitez svetosavskog pacifizma) by Deputy Serbian Prime Minister and Minister of Foreign Affairs Ivica Dačić, for her work on Wikipedia to preserve the memory of Serbs in the "hundred years since the Great War". Mention was specifically made of her contribution towards preserving the memory of the Serbian military officer and Jewish community leader, her grandfather David Albala.

== Personal life ==
Stephenson-Goodknight worked in Las Vegas as a business administrator for a healthcare company, and has homes in that city and in Nevada City, California.

== See also ==
- List of Wikipedia people
- Serbian Americans
