= Offline mobile learning =

Offline mobile learning is the ability to access learning materials on a mobile device without requiring an Internet connection.

Generally, web-based applications functionalities are dependent on ability to access the Web. While there are many practical reasons for an application to access data on a server, not every feature of an application may necessarily need to have such access. Offline access to such features may enhance the user experience and increase access where networks are unavailable, unaffordable (such as in Educational psychologist), rural areas, and those with limited data plans.

Various technologies used to develop education technology support offline functionality such as Progressive web apps and Mobile apps.

== Mobile Learning: Developing Countries ==
In developed countries, emphasis on sophisticated technological devices is a future forward ideal for most developing countries. Nevertheless, these countries realise that M-learning is more than just using a mobile device for E-Learning and requires a different approach. To utilize M-Learning efficiently, it is necessary to understand this approach as technology becomes available.

Mobile technologies have successfully enabled learning opportunities for learners in developing countries who live far from educational facilities and lack the infrastructure to support access.

Users in developing countries have the same need for M-Learning to be mobile, accessible and affordable as those in developed countries. The significance of M-Learning is its ability to make learning mobile, away from the classroom or workplace. Wireless and mobile technologies enable learning opportunities for those without direct access to education. Many learners in developing countries have trouble accessing the internet or affording technology for E-Learning. Mobile devices are a cheaper alternative to traditional E-Learning equipment such as PCs and Laptops.

However, to fully utilize this potential it is imperative to explore the factors that determine mobile telecommunications development in the developing world. Delivering mobile services on open hardware and open software not just practically makes sense but can also lower the cost and thus increase the possibility of offering sustainable services in the future. While the benefits of open-source software are proven, it is important to conduct a broader study to investigate the potential role of relatively new copyleft approach for custom hardware, as supporting mobile learners in their own socio-cultural contexts of developing countries is a significant challenge.

== Technologies ==
A range of devices exist from Mobile devices such as smartphones and tablets to single-purpose devices such as E-book readers. Different combinations of hardware and software can be used to make learner experiences that normally require an Internet connection work offline

=== Learning Management Systems (LMS) ===
Some Learning Management Systems provide offline functionality via Mobile apps and/or offline web technologies. They can use data synchronization to make learning content available offline and submit user data (e.g. assignments) when a connection is available.

=== Making educational websites available offline ===
Web scraping and web archiving can be used to download web content for use offline. It can be complex to scrape dynamic content in such a way that it can work offline the same as it works online (e.g. where the content relies on communication with a server). When standard HTML is rendered the archive will work as expected, however results with dynamic content can vary. Dynamic websites can use service workers to automatically preload all resources required for a site to work offline.

Format	Description
Web ARChive	Web Archive specifies a file format to combining multiple digital resources (e.g. websites, images, scripts). It is a widely used open standard for archiving web content, including by Internet Archive's Wayback Machine.
ZIM	ZIM is an open file format that focuses on supporting the use of Wikipedia offline such as using the open source Kiwix, however can store other content and full-text indexes.
Web Bundle	Web Bundles are a WebPlatform.org incubating proposal for a collection of http resources, each of which can be signed or unsigned. Web bundles can be directly loaded by Chrome/Chromium if enabled and displayed the same as if they had been loaded directly over http.

Projects such as World Possible and Internet-in-a-Box make large collections of scraped websites available offline.

== Challenges ==
Some modern mobile devices have the capability to store thousands of documents and therefore have the potential to be used as powerful offline learning tools.

Typically, the optimal solution is to use the local store as much as possible, since it is usually faster than a remote connection. However, the more work an application does locally, the more code you need to write to implement the feature locally and to synchronize the corresponding data. There is a cost/benefit tradeoff to consider, and some features may not be worthwhile to support locally.

== See also ==
- mLearning
