= 2026 Philippine energy crisis =

Fuel shortage in the Philippines due to the 2026 Iran war

- Part of the 2026 Strait of Hormuz crisis, the economic impact of the 2026 Iran war, and the 2026 Iran war fuel crisis
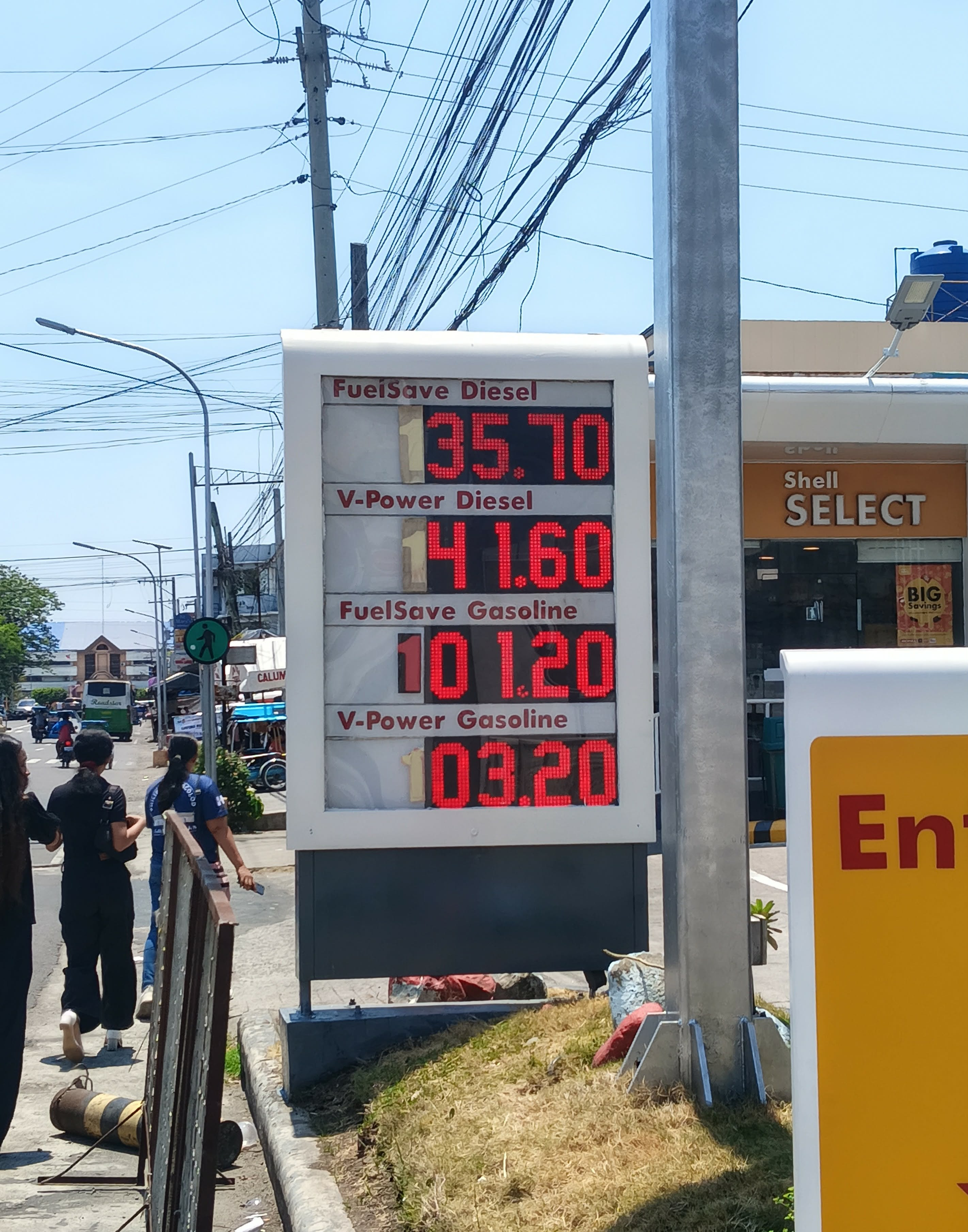
- A price board at a Shell filling station in Bago, Negros Occidental, showing significantly increased fuel prices, with diesel prices reaching over ₱140 (US$2.84) per liter, equivalent to $10.75 per gallon
- Date: March 24, 2026 – June 30, 2026 (7 months, 2 weeks and 3 days)
- Cause: 2026 Iran war

Since late February 2026, the closure of the Strait of Hormuz during the 2026 Iran war disrupted roughly 20 percent of the world's oil supply, triggering a global economic downturn and fuel shortages. The Philippines, which imports most of its oil from the Middle East, was particularly vulnerable to supply disruptions because of its heavy dependence on imported petroleum.

On March 23, Claire Castro, press officer of the Office of the President of the Philippines, said the country was experiencing a "price disruption" caused by the conflict in the Middle East but was not yet facing an oil crisis. Her remarks were echoed by Energy Secretary Sharon Garin. The same day, President Bongbong Marcos ordered the creation of a crisis committee to maintain economic stability and ensure the continued delivery of essential resources, including supplies for schools.

On March 24, Marcos declared a state of national energy emergency, stating that the country had sufficient crude oil supplies until June 30. The Philippines became the first country to declare an energy emergency in response to the war.

According to the Philippine Institute for Development Studies (PIDS), the energy crisis could push between 1.3 million and 3.1 million Filipinos into poverty.

== Declaration ==
President Bongbong Marcos signed Executive Order No. 110, putting the Philippines under a state of national energy emergency due to the 2026 Iran war. As the Philippines imports 98% of its oil from the Middle East, the country was severely affected by the crisis in the Strait of Hormuz.

== Impact ==
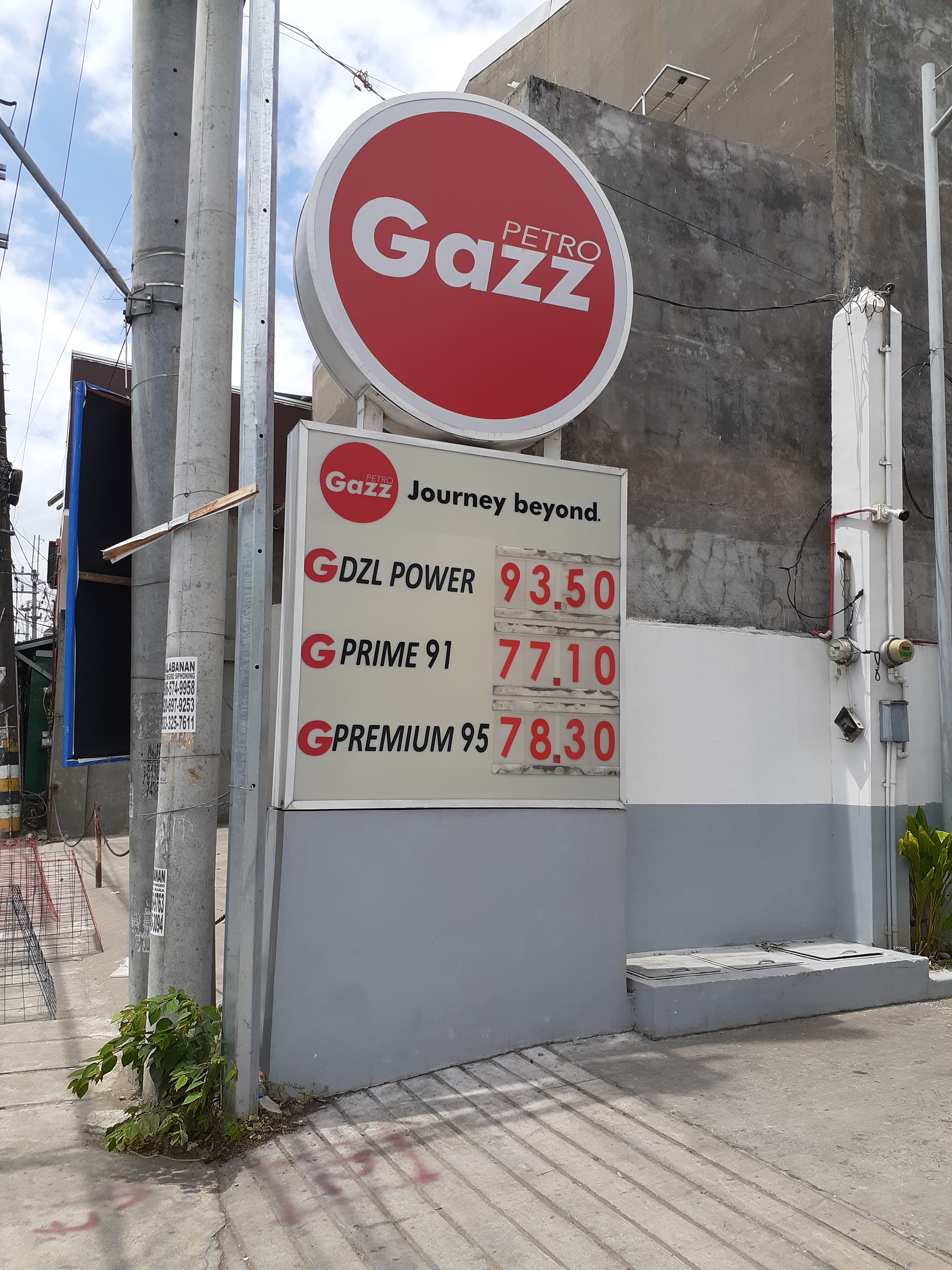
Price board of a filling station in Pulilan on March 18, 2026, showing increased fuel prices due to the effects of the 2026 Iran war

The national oil supply of the Philippines continually diminishes, while inflation is at an all-time high. As of March 20, 2026, the Department of Energy (DOE) stated that the Philippines had an average of 45 days' supply of oil, down from 55 to 57 days when the war started a month ago. The energy crisis also drove sharp increases in other fuels, with liquefied natural gas prices tripling and coal rising by up to 30%. By March 24, the price of diesel exceeded ₱130 (US$2.64) per liter, while gasoline surpassed ₱100 (US$2.03) per liter, as continued Middle East tensions drove a third week of significant increases. Data from the DOE showed substantial price hikes across fuel types, while oil firms implemented adjustments and officials attributed the increases to global market pressures despite a slight slowdown in per-barrel price growth.

=== Gas stations ===
As of March 27, 2026, 425 filling stations across the country have closed, out of the 14,485 stations nationwide that were being monitored by the Philippine National Police (PNP). By April 10, the PNP reported that 387 out of 14,519 gas stations were temporarily closed due to non-delivery of petroleum products.

On May 5, 2026, the PNP reported four gasoline theft incidents at filling stations nationwide since the crisis began.

=== Overseas Filipinos ===
Around 40,000 overseas Filipino workers were stranded in Manila as the country declared deployment ban to various Middle Eastern countries such as Bahrain, Israel, Kuwait, Lebanon, Oman, Qatar, and the United Arab Emirates. Two Filipinos were killed as a result of the conflict.

=== Transportation ===
Cebu Pacific and Philippine Airlines, the largest airlines in the Philippines, suspended several domestic and international routes amid the global fuel price surge and also to conserve local oil reserves.

=== Tourism and retail ===
In Baguio, a popular mountain resort city in the northern Philippines, tourism arrivals dropped by as much as 40-50%. Meanwhile, hotel bookings declined by around 30%. In Nueva Vizcaya, the 2026 Ammungan Festival, which is usually held for five days, was scaled down to just one day due to the crisis.

Several shopping malls in the country reduced their operating hours in response to the energy crisis.

== Power outages ==
On May 13, the National Grid Corporation of the Philippines (NGCP) placed the Luzon grid on high alert, as dozens of power plants became unavailable due to forced outages. The NGCP implemented rotational brownouts throughout the country, leaving almost 2 million people without power with each power outage lasting between two to three hours depending on grid conditions. By May 15, both the Luzon and the Visayas grid were placed on red and yellow alerts, with the yellow alert signaling that energy supply is tight, while the red alert indicates that the power supply is insufficient to meet the demand.

== Response ==
The Philippine government stated that it was exploring alternative oil suppliers and holding talks with non-traditional sources, such as China, India, and Russia, to help maintain a stable fuel supply amid global market uncertainty and price volatility.

On March 25, 2026, President Bongbong Marcos signed into law Republic Act (RA) 12316, authorizing him until December 31, 2028, to suspend or reduce excises on petroleum products for up to three months to address rising oil prices. That day, the Department of Budget and Management also approved the release of ₱20 billion (US$406.09 million) from the Malampaya gas fund to the DOE to secure fuel supply and stabilize availability amid global disruptions. The funds were allocated to procure fuel and support emergency energy measures, with procurement initiated by the state-owned Philippine National Oil Company Exploration Corporation (PNOCEC) to help prevent shortages and maintain essential services. On April 11, Energy Secretary Sharon Garin announced the arrival of about 329,000 barrels of diesel from Malaysia, part of a 900,000-barrel shipment procured by PNOCEC that was scheduled for delivery in three batches in April. In March 2026, the DOE also temporarily authorized limited use of Euro II petroleum products to preserve fuel availability, restricting the measure to older vehicle models and specified sectors such as traditional jeepneys, power plants and generators, and the marine and shipping sectors.

On March 26, the Energy Regulatory Commission (ERC) suspended electricity sales on the Wholesale Electricity Spot Market due to fuel supply risks. The ERC said a modified pricing scheme would be introduced as electricity prices surged, with temporary measures prioritizing renewable energy and conserving fuel supplies while the market remained under government intervention.

Petron Corporation ordered 700,000 barrels of oil from Russia, taking advantage of the United States' thirty-day waiver on countries purchasing sanctioned Russian petroleum products already at sea. The U.S. sanctions were in place due to the Russian invasion of Ukraine. The Philippine government said that it was working to obtain similar waivers from other U.S.-sanctioned countries.

The Department of Agriculture activated ₱1 billion (US$20.3 million) from its quick-response fund following the declaration of a national energy emergency, allocating ₱500 million (US$10.15 million) for fuel subsidies to fisherfolk and another ₱500 million for fertilizer procurement, with rollout expected in May after the Presidential Assistance for Farmers and Fisherfolk program.

On April 1, 2026, amid the Strait of Hormuz crisis, the Department of Foreign Affairs requested Iran to designate the Philippines as a "non-hostile" country to ensure safe passage for Philippine-flagged vessels and oil shipments through the Strait of Hormuz. On April 2, Iranian foreign minister Abbas Araghchi assured his Philippine counterpart, Secretary Tess Lazaro, that Philippine vessels, energy shipments, and Filipino seafarers would be allowed safe and unhindered passage through the strait.

The Department of Education (DepEd) has allowed private schools to shift to flexible learning, including online classes, in response to the national energy emergency. DepEd also implemented a four-day workweek for school-based non-teaching staff and related teaching personnel, while remote work arrangements are implemented every Friday.

On April 13, 2026, President Marcos said the government removed excises on liquefied petroleum gas (LPG) and kerosene to help ease rising fuel costs for households. The measure, implemented under RA 12316, was expected to reduce prices by about ₱3.36 (US$0.07) per liter for LPG and ₱5.6 (US$0.11) per liter for kerosene.

The Civil Aeronautics Board (CAB) said fuel surcharges for passenger and cargo flights would increase to Level 19 for April 16–30, 2026, from Level 8 earlier in the month due to rising fuel costs. The adjustment raised additional charges to ₱627 (US$12.73)–₱1,837 (US$37.3) for domestic passenger flights and ₱2,070.77 (US$42.05)–₱15,397.15 (US$312.63) for international passenger flights, depending on distance. For cargo services, surcharges rose to ₱3.22 (US$0.07)–₱9.43 (US$0.19) for domestic flights and ₱10.65 (US$0.22)–₱79.15 (US$1.61) for international flights. The CAB reduced the fuel surcharge for May 16–31 from Level 18 to Level 15. Under the new level, domestic fuel surcharges ranged from ₱491 (US$9.97) to ₱1,436 (US$29.16), while international surcharges ranged from ₱1,621.42 (US$32.92) to ₱12,056 (US$244.79), as authorities continued a 15-day monitoring cycle.

The PNP has been monitoring fuel stations, supply depots, and other critical energy infrastructure nationwide to deter illegal activities and ensure continued access to essential services. On May 5, 2026, the PNP announced a three-strike policy against police commanders who fail to address gasoline theft incidents after four cases were recorded. Police officials said an initial incident should serve as a warning for commanders to strengthen security measures within their jurisdictions.

=== Local responses ===
Due to the energy crisis, a state of calamity was declared in the Bangsamoro region, the provinces of Cagayan and Sorsogon, the cities of Baguio and Zamboanga City, and in the towns of Ajuy and New Lucena in Iloilo, Calanasan in Apayao, and Paracelis in Mountain Province. A state of local emergency was also declared in Bongao in Tawi-Tawi, as well as in Cagayan de Oro.

== Reactions ==
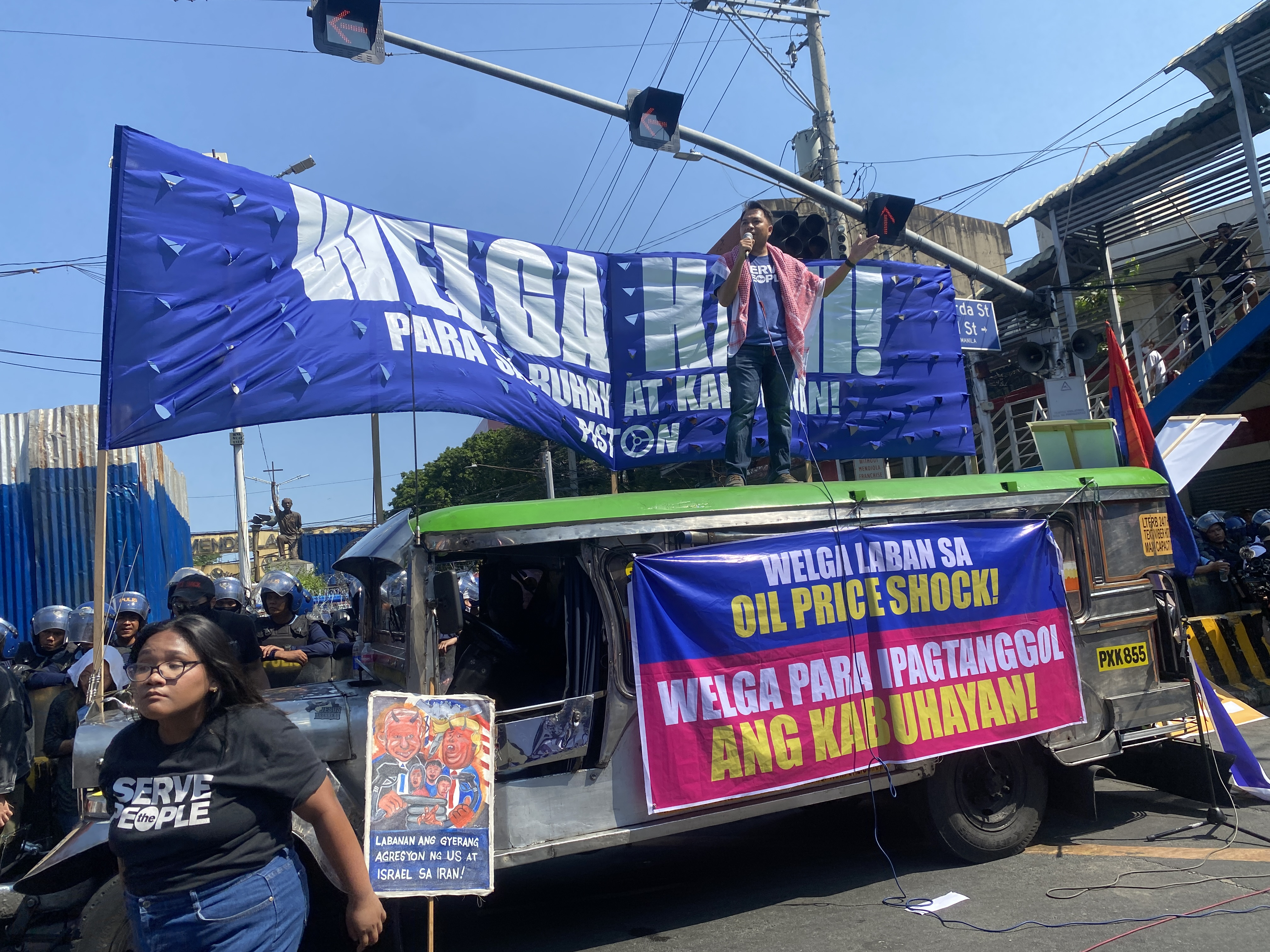

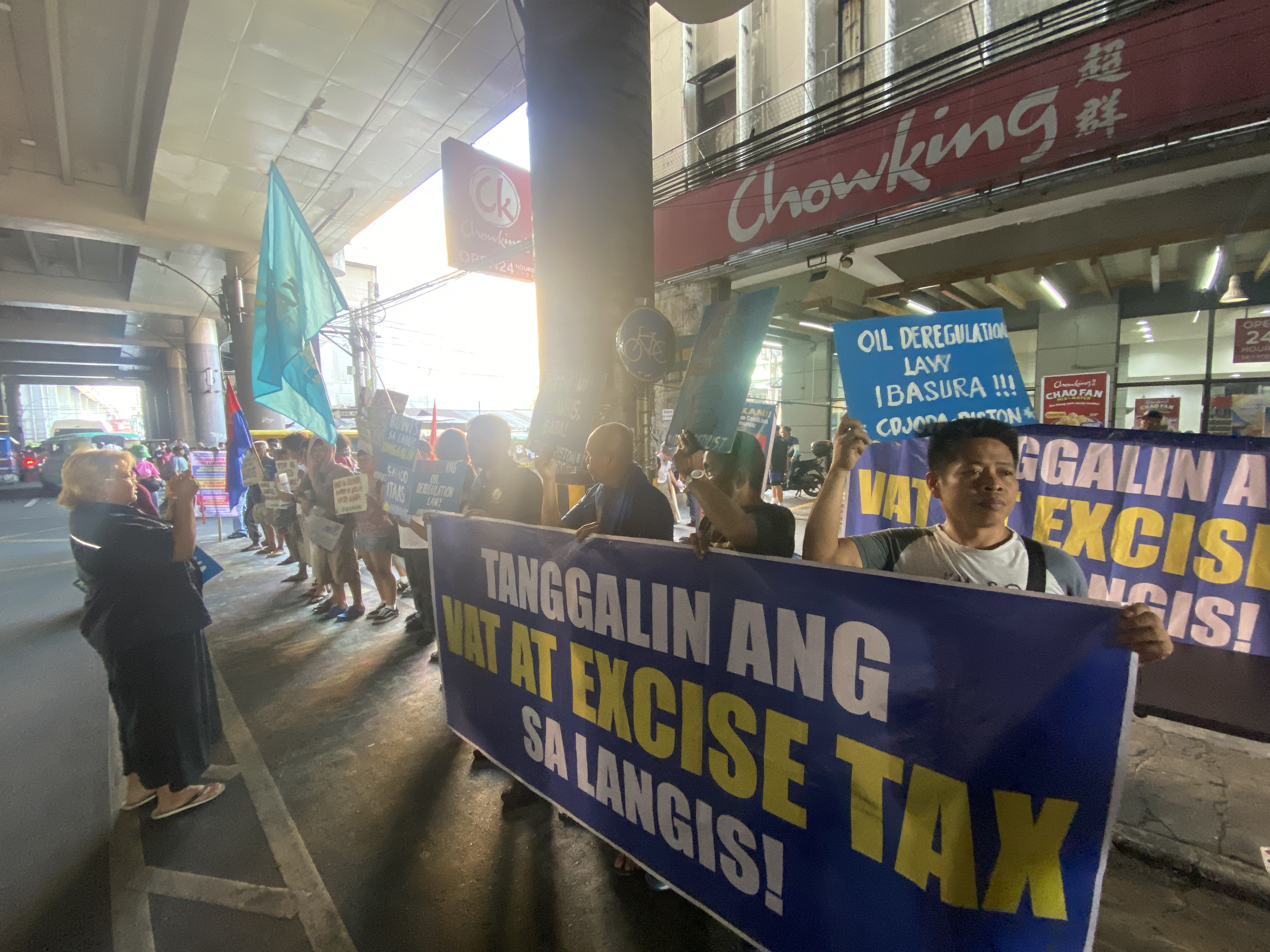
Transport groups protesting in Manila, demanding the removal of VAT and excises, and the repeal of the oil deregulation law

Transport strikes have occurred in various parts of the country over rising oil prices. To maintain peace and order, the PNP has tightened security in key energy facilities.

Groups and opposition lawmakers called for the repeal of Republic Act 8479 or the Oil Deregulation Law, with Senate President Tito Sotto filing a bill to restore government authority over fuel pricing. The law had deregulated the downstream sector to promote competition and investment, but also limited the government's ability to intervene in price spikes. Officials acknowledged that current law restricts the DOE from capping prices, prompting Energy Secretary Sharon Garin to call for a review of the Oil Deregulation Law, arguing that the current free-market framework is insufficient in periods of volatility. The Malacañang said any repeal would depend on Congress.

Following the announcement of a ceasefire agreement between Iran and the United States on April 8, Secretary Garin said fuel prices were unlikely to return to pre-war levels soon due to damage to oil infrastructure in the Middle East and the Philippines' heavy reliance on imported supply. She proposed establishing a national oil stockpile and dedicated funding to reduce vulnerability, citing high costs and limited storage capacity as key challenges. Garin said fuel supply remained adequate, with about 50 days of inventory and ongoing deliveries, but stated that price controls were not permitted under existing law.

Former associate justice of the Supreme Court Antonio Carpio exhorted the government to carry out a "joint cooperation" in their proposed oil exploration with China instead of a "joint development" being proposed by the Chinese government. He stated that a joint cooperation aligns with both the Constitution and the South China Sea Arbitration regarding the country's exclusive economic zone. Joint development, according to Carpio, "means China owns the oil and gas, but out of friendship with other countries, it will allow other countries to participate in developing the oil or gas field". However, Rear Admiral Roy Vincent Trinidad of the Armed Forces of the Philippines warned, "the Chinese Communist Party is not a reliable partner", citing the "difference in the way they speak and their actions on the ground".

== See also ==
- 1970s energy crisis
- Energy in the Philippines
- Iran–Philippines relations
