= Beedeez =

- Type: Private
- Industry: Learning management system
- Founded: 2015
- Founder: Julien Huelvan; Morgan Laupies; Remi Deh; Quentin Brunel
- Headquarters: Paris, France
- Key people: Julien Huelvan (CEO)
- Website: https://www.beedeez.com

Beedeez is a French company founded in 2015, that provides an Learning management system.

== History ==
Beedeez was founded in 2015 by Julien Huelvan, Morgan Laupies, Rémi Deh, and Quentin Brunel. The company initially focused on developing a training platform for operational and mobile employees. Over the following years, it expanded its use across sectors such as retail, manufacturing, logistics, food service, and healthcare.

The startup joined the support program L'Accélérateur during its early development phase. In January 2024, it announced a fundraising round with Arkéa Capital through the We Positive Invest 2 fund.

== See also ==
- Learning management system
- Professional development
- E-learning
- Mobile learning
