= Afripedia Project =

Project to increase coverage of Wikipedia in Francophone Africa

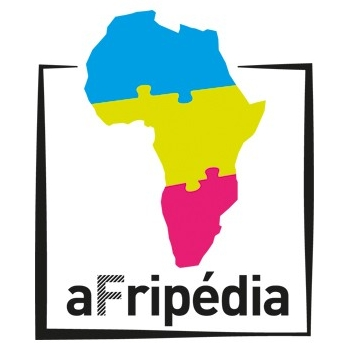
- Afripedia Logo

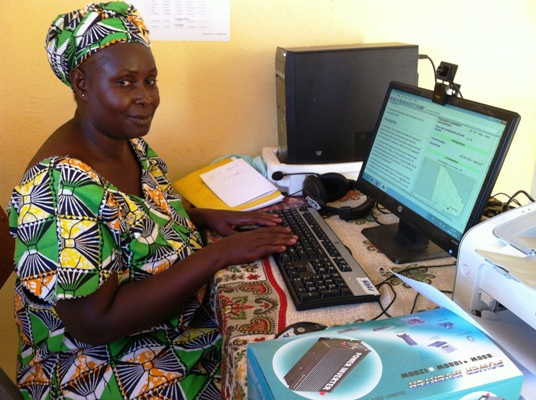
A teacher using Kiwix in Koulikoro, Mali

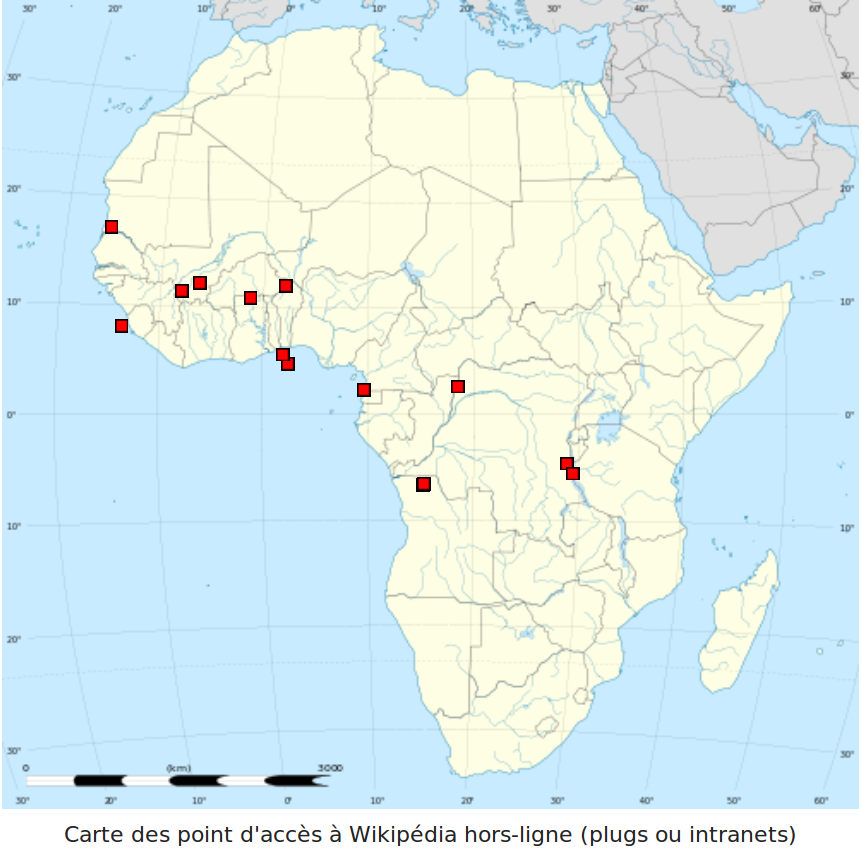
Locations of 13 universities where Kiwix was deployed as part of the Afripedia project

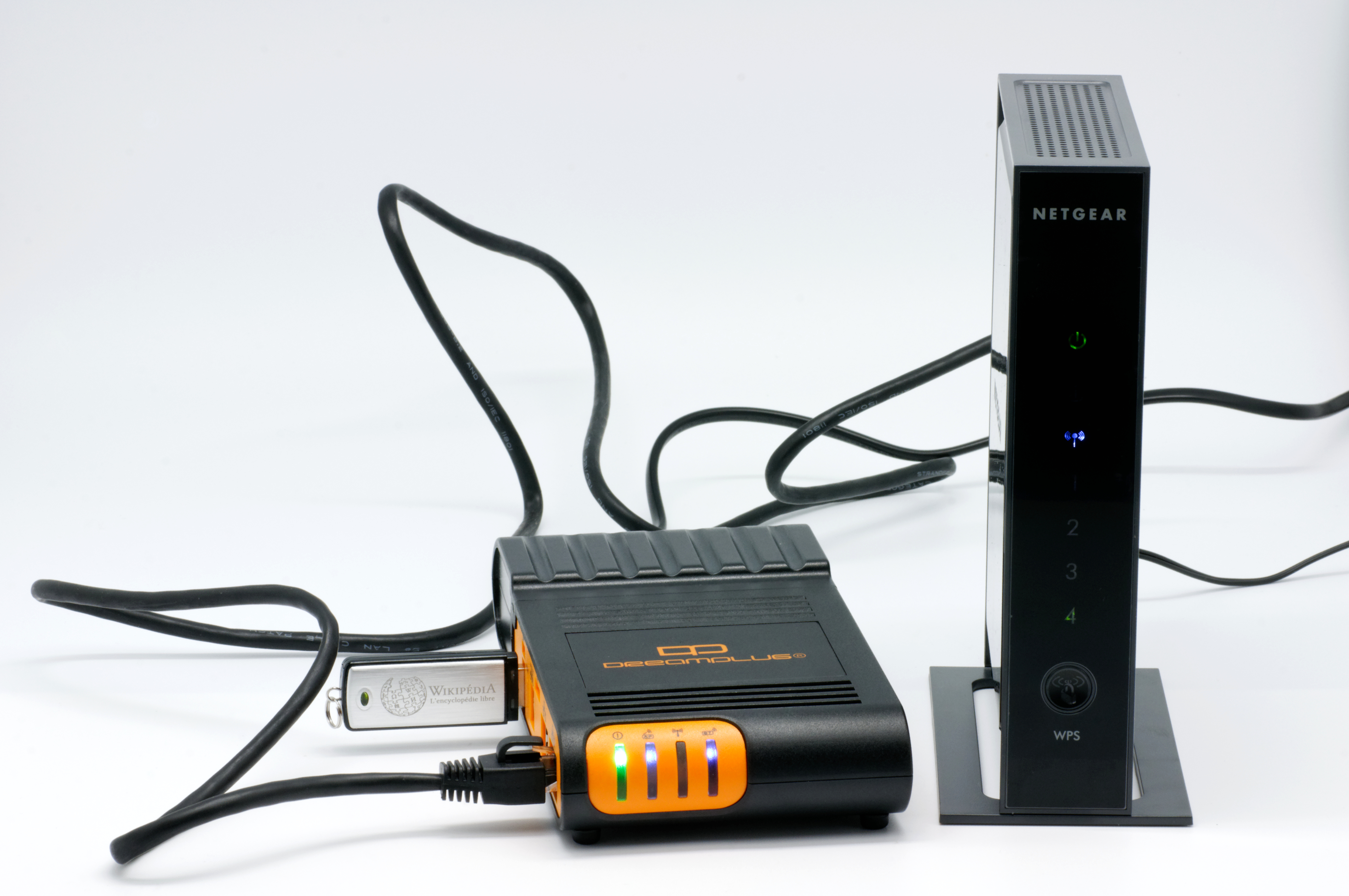
Hardware (a plug computer, yellow, a wireless router, and a USB drive carrying a fresh copy of the French Wikipedia) used in the Afripedia project

The Afripedia Project is a project to expand offline Wikipedia access in French-speaking Africa, and encourage Africans to contribute to Wikipedia. The project installs local Kiwix-serve wireless and intranet servers and provides training and maintenance.

The project offers content besides Wikipedia, such as Wiktionary. Any content that is first packaged in a ZIM file can be relayed over the Afripedia network; Project Gutenberg and Wikisource, for instance, are available in that format.

== History ==
The Afripedia Project launched in 2012. The founding partners were Wikimédia France, the Institut Français, and the Agence universitaire de la Francophonie. French is spoken by an estimated 120 million (2010) people in Africa, spread across 24 francophone countries.

Project preparation, partnership formation, Kiwix algorithm development took place in 2011.

In July 2012 the project and prototype was presented at the Forum mondial de la langue française in Québec. In November 15 leaders from 12 East and Central African countries were trained and 15 offline access points were deployed.

Additional training session were held in 2013 and 2014.

Access to Wikipedia from USB flash drives was not new at the time, but the data they carry quickly became outdated. Afripedia by contrast is regularly updated. Many of the partnering universities have low-bandwidth internet and a few lack any internet access.

The project encourages the formation of Afripedia clubs for local users.

The project was described as a worthy stopgap measure, until such time as internet access can be developed throughout Africa.

== See also ==
- Internet-in-a-box
