= Flexible learning =

Student-centered education

Flexible learning is a principle of practice in formal education, concerned with increasing flexibility in the requirements, time and location of study, teaching, assessment and certification

Flexible learning is not limited to online learning: it can include choices about when, where and how learning takes place, including part-time, distance, workplace-based and face-to-face forms of study. Collis and Moonen describe flexible learning as a broader way of understanding changes in learning, teaching, educational support, institutional organisation and technology use.

== History ==
Flexible learning saw significant development in New Zealand and Australia throughout the late 90s and early 2000s, along with investments in online learning.

== See also ==
- Blended learning
- Flipped learning
- M-learning
- Networked learning
- Distance education
- Virtual education
- Virtual university
