= Iran–Philippines relations =

- Iran: Philippines

Diplomatic mission
- Embassy of the Islamic Republic of Iran, Manila: Embassy of the Philippines, Tehran

Envoy
- Ambassador Yousef Esmaeil Zadeh: Ambassador Roberto G. Manalo

Iran and the Philippines have maintained foreign relations since diplomatic relations were established on January 22, 1964. There is a community of thousands of Iranians in the Philippines including many international students drawn by the country's low-cost English education.

The Philippines is represented in Iran by Charge d' Affairs, Roberto G. Manalo, while Iran is currently represented in the Philippines by Ambassador Yousef Esmaeil Zadeh.

== Diplomatic relations ==
Building in Makati, Philippines which hosts the Cultural Section of the Embassy of Iran in Manila

Iran and the Philippines have embassies in one another's capitals, though the two do not share extensive bilateral relations. In August 2003, Manila and Tehran held their first bilateral conference entitled "Dialogue Among Civilizations". In April 2008, Philippine Secretary of Foreign Affairs Alberto Romulo called for the expansion of bilateral ties with Iran and claimed that the two countries have enjoyed good relations in the past, giving promise to a positive future relationship.

During an April 2009 meeting with the Filipino Ambassador to Iran, Generoso Senga, Iranian Foreign Minister Manouchehr Mottaki noted the positive nature of bilateral ties and expressed hope that relations, especially in the fields of energy, technology, science, and culture, would continue to expand. In the same meeting, Mottaki blamed the reactions of “extra-regional powers” for expanding extremism in Asia. In February 2010, the Emilio Aguinaldo College in Manila opened Iranian Cultural Week, which hosted a series of programs and exhibits on Iranian culture. The series was attended by Iran's cultural ambassador and several Iranian cultural and political figures.

On June 28, 2010, Mottaki demanded that the Philippine government conduct “an effective investigation” into a bus crash that left several Iranian medical students dead. Ambassador Senaga responded to Mottaki's concerns saying he has “been pursuing the incident. Iranian Ambassador to the Philippines Ali Asghar Mohammadi said that "Iran is committed to improving its overall relationship with the Philippines".

On January 31, 2016, the Philippines expressed its plans to establish an honorary consulate in Kish considering the presence of Filipinos in the Iranian coastal city.

== Economic relations ==
Hydrocarbons remain the main avenue of economic interaction for Iran and the Philippines. In 2006, the Philippines purchased between 70,000 and 110,000 barrels of oil a day from Iran, making the country one of the Philippines’ most significant trade partners in the region. In 2008, Iran agreed to invest $125 million petrochemical market in the Philippines.

Iran and the Philippines have agreed to ensure better labour conditions for Filipino maritime workers. The sides penned a memorandum of agreement following a June 2010 meeting of the 2010 Diplomatic Conference of Parties to the International Convention on Standards of Training, Certification, and Watchkeeping. According to the agreement, Iran will henceforth recognize Philippine maritime certificates of competencies. Then-Filipino Labor Secretary Marianito Roque expressed his “appreciation to the Iranian government for its willingness to enter into an agreement with the Philippines and claimed that “the recognition is essential to the continued employment of Filipino seafarers in the international maritime industry.

As of February 2016, Iran is one of the six nations which the Philippines has a Joint Economic Commission at a ministerial level.

The 2026 Iran war, and subsequent closure of the Strait of Hormuz, has had a large economic impact on southeast Asian countries, especially the Philippines, due to their heavy reliance on Middle Eastern oil. On April 1, 2026, the Philippines requested that Iran designate it as a "non-hostile" country and ensure the safe passage of Philippine vessels and oil tankers through the Strait of Hormuz. On April 2, Iranian Foreign Minister Seyed Abbas Araghchi assured the Philippines that Iran will allow Philippine vessels safe and unhindered passage through the strait.

=== US-led sanction on Iran ===
As part of sanctions against Iran's nuclear program by the United States, the Philippines was pressured to import less oil from Iran to avoid facing sanctions itself. On 2011, the Philippines imported 5.9 million barrels of crude oil from Iran. However by the end of March 2012, the Philippines did not import any oil from Iran. Earlier in January 2012, President Benigno Aquino III appealed to a number of U.S. lawmakers to consider Philippine interests, as it would want to maintain "non-harmful" trade with Iran. Philippine fruit exports to Iran was greatly affected. 30 percent of Philippine banana exports goes to Iran.

In June 2013, Iran has expressed concerns that the Philippines is "missing opportunities" by giving in to the United States and other Western countries demand to cooperate in their efforts to sanction Iran. Ali A. Mohammadi, previous Iranian ambassador to the Philippines, noted that annual trade between Iran and the Philippines dropped to a "minimal level", from 2011's balance of $900 million.

Obstacles against the trade relations between the two countries were reduced with the easing of sanctions against Iran with the securing of the Iran nuclear deal.

== Nuclear program ==
Philippine Foreign Affairs Undersecretary Rafael Seguis voiced his government's support in June 2008 for Iran's right to use peaceful nuclear energy. The undersecretary said that given rising hydrocarbon prices, all countries should be able to access civilian nuclear energy. In April 2008, Romulo also said that his country supports Iran's right to access peaceful nuclear technology under the safeguards of the Nuclear Non-Proliferation Treaty.

== Security relations ==
In 2016, Iran offered to share intelligence to the Philippines in an effort to combat terrorism in Southeast Asia, particularly to deter the militant organization, ISIS from establishing itself in the region.

== See also ==
- Iranians in the Philippines
