= XOWA =

Software to host an offline Wikipedia

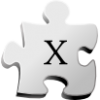

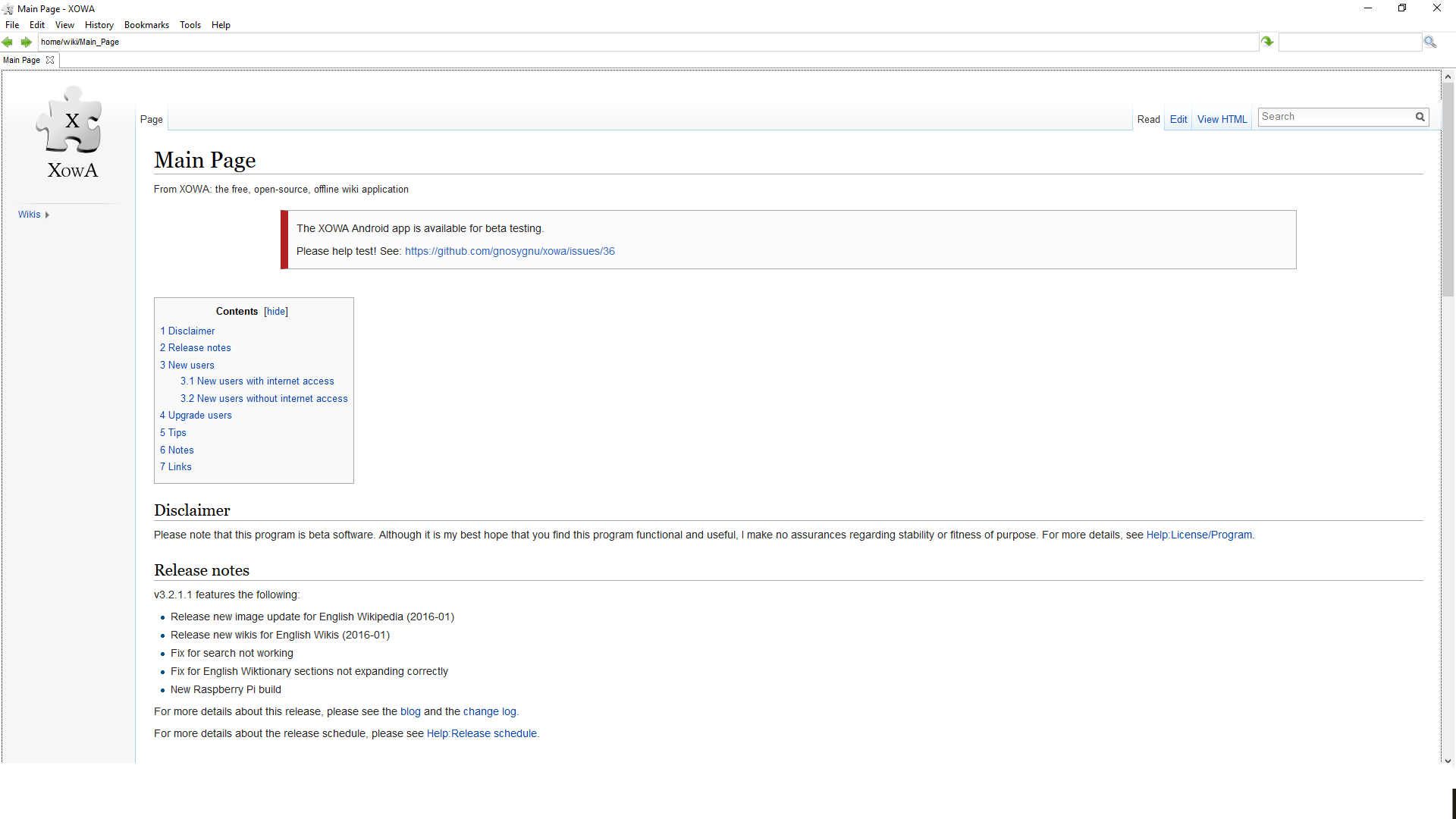
- Screenshot of XOWA
- Repository: github.com/gnosygnu/xowa
- Written in: Java
- License: AGPLv3
- Website: xowa.org

XOWA is a free and open-source application written primarily in Java by anonymous developers and is intended for users who wish to run their own copy of Wikipedia, or any other compatible wiki, offline without an internet connection. XOWA is compatible with Microsoft Windows, MacOS, Linux and Android. Licensed under the GNU AGPLv3, XOWA is free software.

== Main features ==
XOWA allows users to download and import their own copy of Wikipedia using official database dumps, or by special database files specifically created for use within XOWA. The application is designed to accurately display Wikipedia content through its own internal browser, or by a locally hosted web server which allows users to access content using any browser of choice. Users can also host content across their own network.

== See also ==
- Kiwix
