= Iranians in the Philippines =

Total population
- 234 (2004)

Regions with significant populations
- Manila

Religion
- Islam

There is a community of Iranians in the Philippines, including many international students drawn by the country's low-cost English education. According to the figures of the 2000 Philippines census, they were the 11th-largest group of immigrants and expats.

== Migration history ==
Drawn by low tuition fees and the use of English as the medium of instruction, Iranian students began studying in the Philippines as early as the 1960s. By the late 1970s there were between 2,500 and 3,500 Iranian students in the Philippines, largely in Manila. Though they were given scholarships by the government of the Shah, many of them were supporters of Imam Khomeini. After the Iranian Revolution in February 1979, seven hundred Iranian students broke into the Iranian embassy and hung a picture of Khomeini there. Iranian students also took an interest in political issues involving Islam in the Philippines. They mixed with local Muslims and held joint protests with them, and arranged for the shipment and distribution of religious literature from Iran. This naturally aroused the suspicion of Ferdinand Marcos' government, which ordered the Department of Education to carefully examine all the files of the Iranian students. No Iranian students were admitted for study in 1980, and 30 were deported.

However unrest continued in the following years. Iranian students continued to arrange various political demonstrations. Pro-Khomeini and anti-Khomeini students engaged in violent clashes. The Khomeini supporters were known to be in contact with the Moro National Liberation Front, sending them funds and arms; they also assassinated some anti-Khomeini students. In 1981, Philippine government charged another 200 Iranian students with committing acts "inimical to national interests" and violating their conditions of stay in the Philippines, and had them deported. However violent clashes continued to be reported as late as 1987.

As of 2010, Iran continued to send thousands of students to the Philippines. Iranians were the third-largest group of 9(F) student visa holders that year, amounting to 2,980 persons, behind Chinese and Koreans. Among these are a number of Iranian medical students in Cebu, who in 2010 fell victim to the a tragic and widely reported bus accident which led to an inquiry by the Iranian embassy.

== Special treatment for refugees ==
Some of the anti-Khomeini students were recognised as refugees; by 2008, two of them had even naturalised as Philippine citizens. Among the refugees were some former Iranian diplomatic representatives who served under the Shah, Mohammad Reza Pahlavi, took up residence in the Philippines, such as labor attaché Khosrow Minuchehr, who was said to be behind much of the anti-Khomeini protests in the 1980s. Many Iranians married to Filipinos have been able to obtain "Section 13(A)" status, equivalent to permanent residency, with freedom to work, study, and do business in any field except those restricted for Philippine citizens; however, they still require an exit/re-entry visa for international travel. Officially, 13(A) status requires possession of an unexpired passport, but Philippine officials have often waived this requirement in the case of Iranians. By the early 1990s, Iranians formed the majority of non-Indochinese refugees in the Philippines. However, because of the violence between pro-government and anti-government Iranian factions in the Philippines, Iranians were classified as "Restricted aliens", meaning Iranians not already in the Philippines would henceforth find it quite difficult to enter the country and then remain as refugees.

== Notable people ==
- Joey Mead King, model, VJ, and TV and events host
- Kian Kazemi, restaurateur and former actor and TV host
- Carlos Agassi, actor, rapper, & restaurateur
- Misagh Bahadoran, footballer
- Richard Heydarian, political scientist, columnist, and media personality

== See also ==
- Iran–Philippines relations
- Iranian diaspora
- Immigration to the Philippines

== Bibliography ==
- Mantāphō̜n, Withit (1992), The status of refugees in Asia, Oxford University Press, ISBN 978-0-19-825668-7
- Yegar, Moshe (2002), Between integration and secession: the Muslim communities of the southern Philippines, Southern Thailand, and western Burma/Myanmar, Lexington Books, ISBN 978-0-7391-0356-2
