= 2010 Balamban bus accident =

Road incident in the Philippines

Details
- Date: June 13, 2010
- Location: Trans Central Highway, Balamban, Cebu, Philippines

Statistics
- Deaths: at least 21
- Injured: at least 26

The crash of a bus in Balamban, Cebu, Philippines, killed at least 21 people and another 26 were wounded on 13 June 2010.

== Overview ==
The bus was carrying around 50 passengers, mostly Iranian expatriates who were post-graduate students at the University of the Visayas and Cebu Doctors' University. The bus had been travelling from Cebu City to Balamban. At around 11:30 am, local time, while the bus was traversing the Trans Central Highway in Balamban, Cebu, the brakes apparently failed and the bus fell some 30 meters into a ravine. At least 21 of the passengers were killed, while around 30 were injured.

The Iranian government announced that its embassy in Manila would be probing the bus accident, whose fatalities were mostly Iranian. The Iranian government also announced that it would be sending special aircraft to the Philippines to evacuate its injured nationals. Iranians students had been in the Philippines under a special arrangement for a residency program with the Professional Regulation Commission.

President Gloria Macapagal Arroyo ordered an immediate probe into the accident. It emerged that the owner of the tourist bus, J & D Tours, had not been accredited by the Department of Tourism, and its remaining vehicles were impounded by local authorities.

== See also ==
- List of road accidents 2000–2010
