= Ammungan Festival =

Festival held in Nueva Vizcaya, Philippines

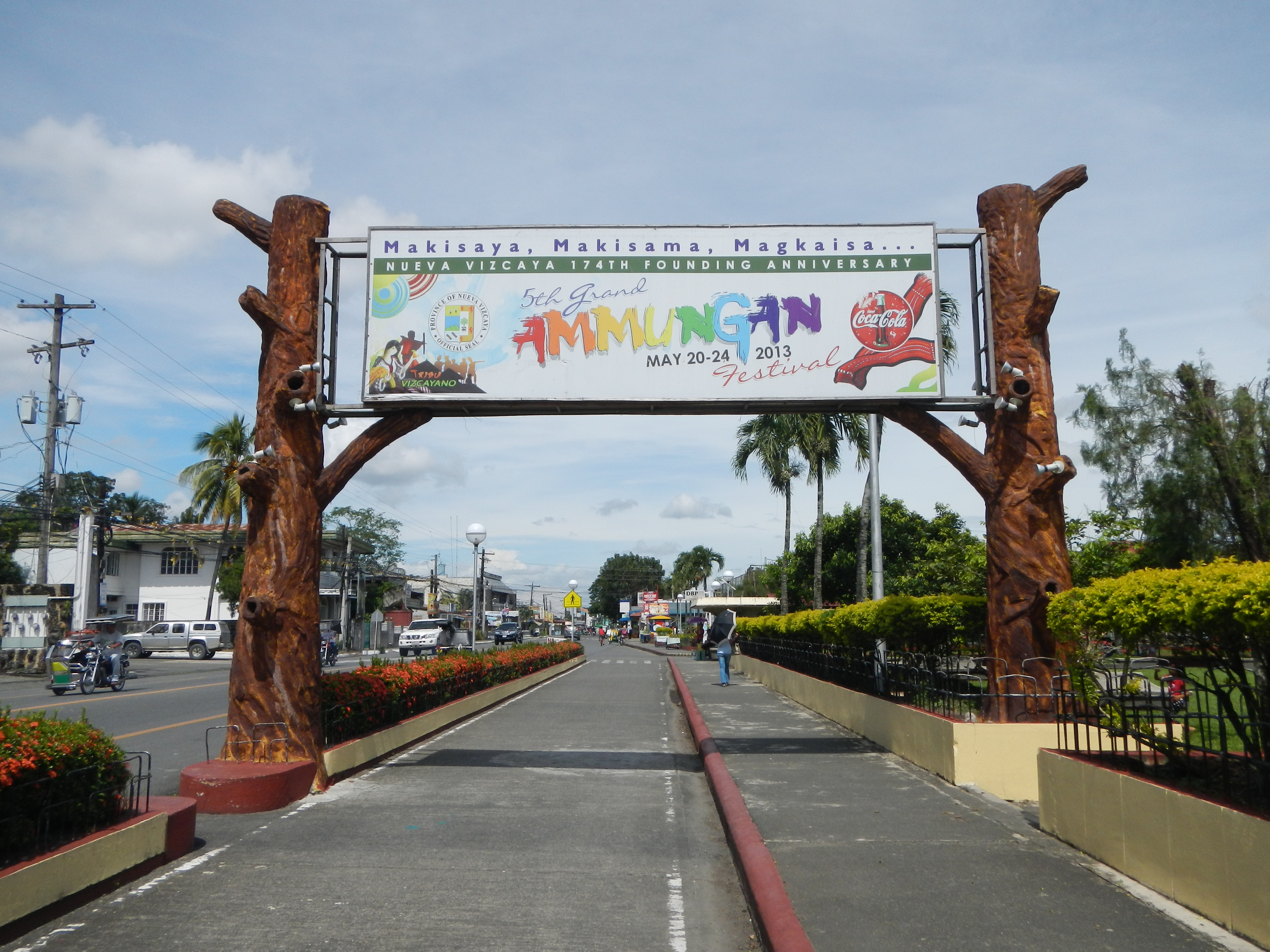
- Banner for the festival in 2013
- Official name: Grand Ammungan Festival
- Observed by: Nueva Vizcaya
- Begins: May 19
- Ends: May 24
- Duration: 5 days
- Frequency: Annual
- First time: May 24, 2009

The Grand Ammungan Festival also known as Ammungan Festival or Nueva Vizcaya Day is a five-day annual festival held in Nueva Vizcaya, Philippines in celebration of the province's founding anniversary.

== Etymology ==
The word "Ammungan" is a Gaddang word meaning "coming together" or "gathering" symbolizing unity of the different tribes of Nueva Vizcaya.

== History ==
The festival was started in 1986 by the Nueva Vizcaya Historical Foundation and was formerly named "Panagyaman", an Ilocano word for "Thanksgiving". The festival was in celebration of the founding anniversary of the province of Nueva Vizcaya.

On May 24, 2009, in celebration for the 170th founding anniversary of the province. The first Grand Ammungan Festival was held in Bayombong, Nueva Vizcaya.

The 2026 Ammungan Festival was reduced from five day event to just one day because of the 2026 Philippine energy crisis.

== Events ==
Different shows are held such as the "Cultural and Indigenous Peoples Night" where people from different tribes showcase their culture and traditions, "Children’s Day" where child-friendly games and activities are held, "Search for Saniata ti Tribu Vizcayano" where a beauty pageant is held at provincial capitol featuring one contestant from the 15 municipalities in the province, and "Grand Parade and Float Competition".

The festival also holds a "Tourism expo" to promote tourist attraction from different towns in the province and an Agri-Trade Fair where products from different municipalities from the province was displayed.

Other activities in festival includes: a dance competitions from different schools, and a culinary contest.

== See also ==
- List of festivals in the Philippines
