= Internet-in-a-Box =

Box providing wireless internet access

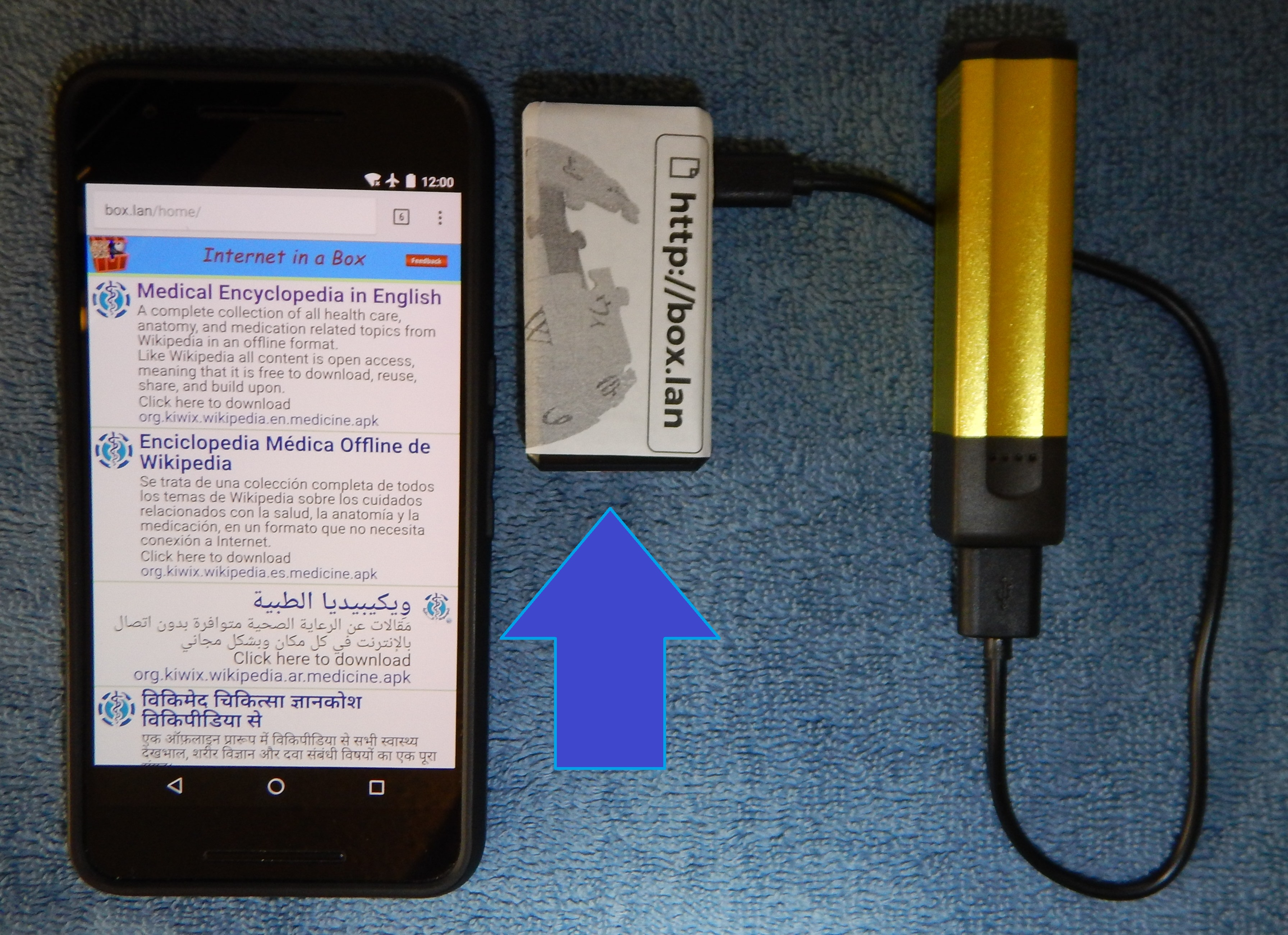
- The 2017 set-up of an offline medical library. Anyone physically near to the device may connect to it and download the offline content it contains.

Internet-in-a-Box (IIAB) is a low-cost digital library, consisting of a wireless access point with storage, which users nearby can connect to. The hardware and software from which it is built has changed since 2012, as miniaturization of storage space and electronics progressed. As of 2017, its hardware often consists of a Raspberry Pi with a replaceable storage card.

In 2016, Columbia University's Masters in Public Administration in Development Practice (MPA-DP) explored using these boxes in the Dominican Republic for three months.

Distribution of devices assembled by Wiki Project Med Foundation via the Wikipedia Store began in 2024. It ships a Raspberry Pi Zero 2 W with a 256 GB SD card, which contains all of English and Spanish Wikipedia, among other resources.

== Digital library ==
The digital library is composed of multiple modules; modules may be pre-installed, or users may choose which to install. Examples of modules include Wikipedia in a specific language, Wikipedia's Medical Encyclopedia, Khan Academy Lite, and OpenStreetMap. Other content includes Moodle, Nextcloud, MediaWiki, PhET (interactive mathematics and science simulations), TED Talks.

== History ==
The concept grew out of One Laptop per Child's school server project.

QR Code to access IIAB device

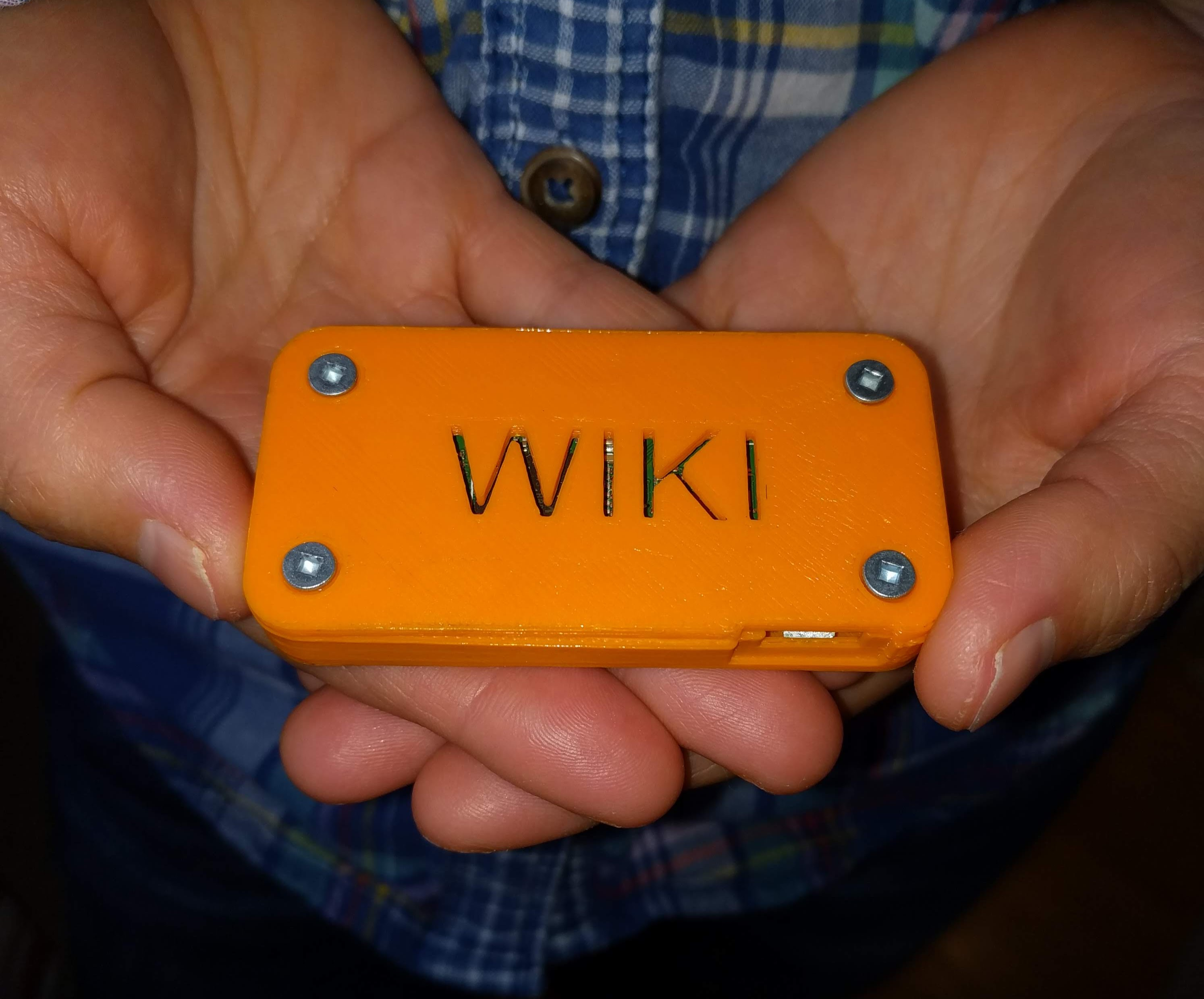
2018 version with 3-D printed box

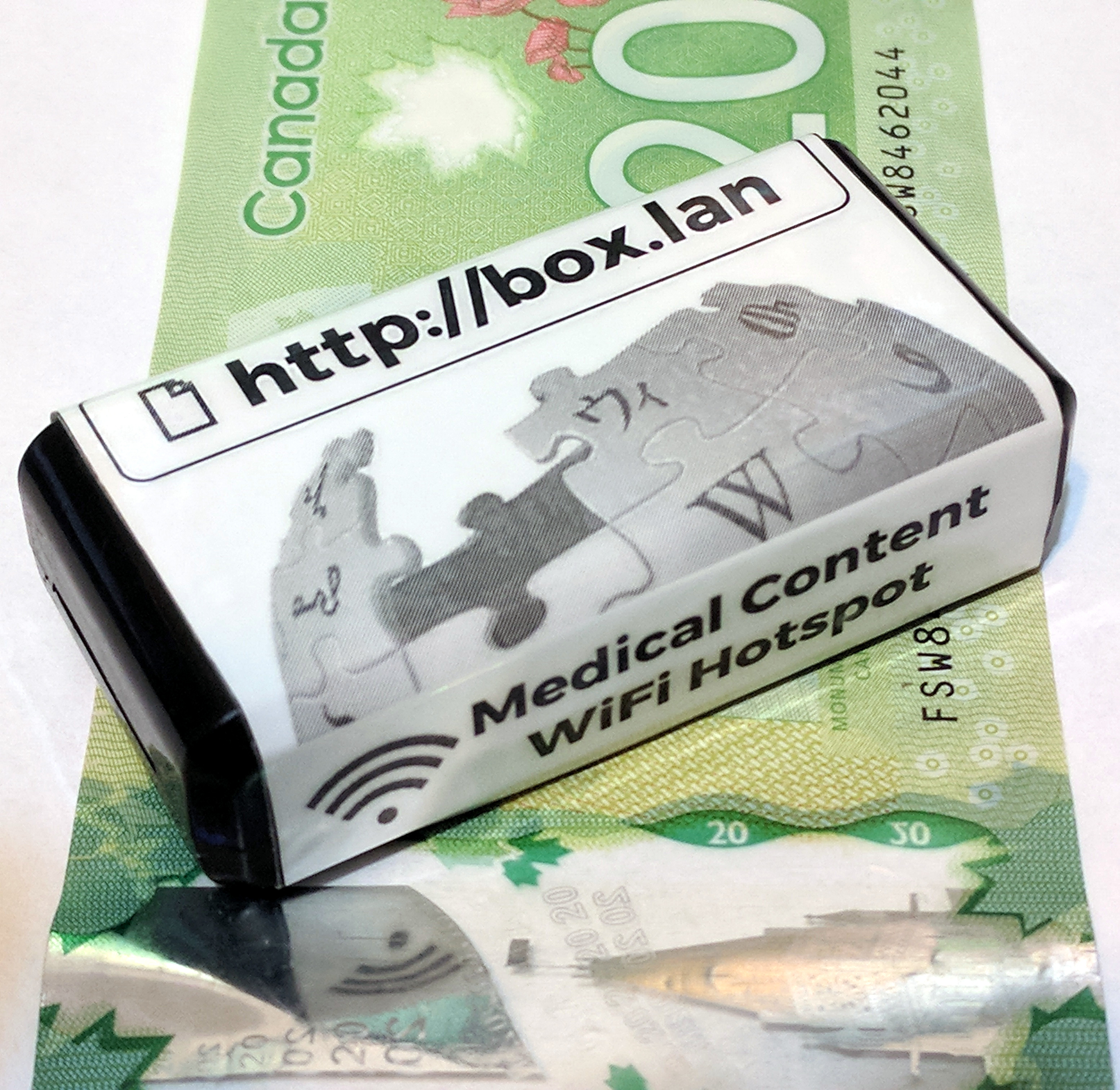
2017 version of IIAB with medical content

Video overview of efforts in Dominican Republic

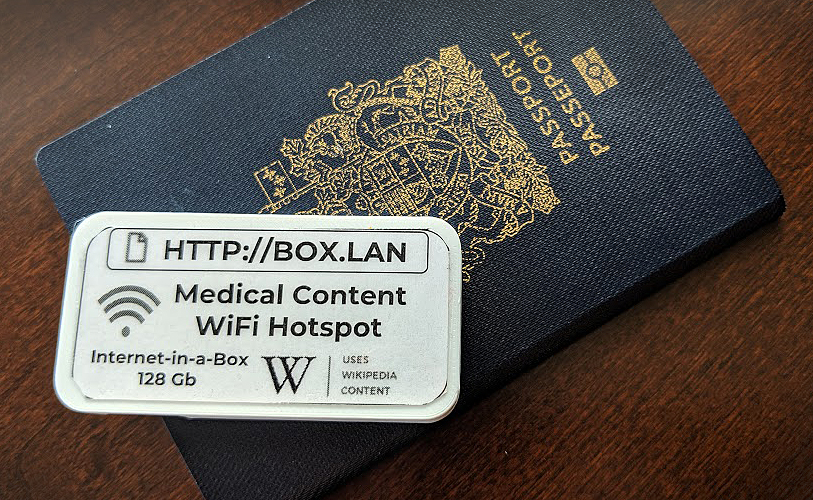
Internet-in-a-Box 2019 version compared to passport

Video discussing the rollout of IIAB in Peru in 2018

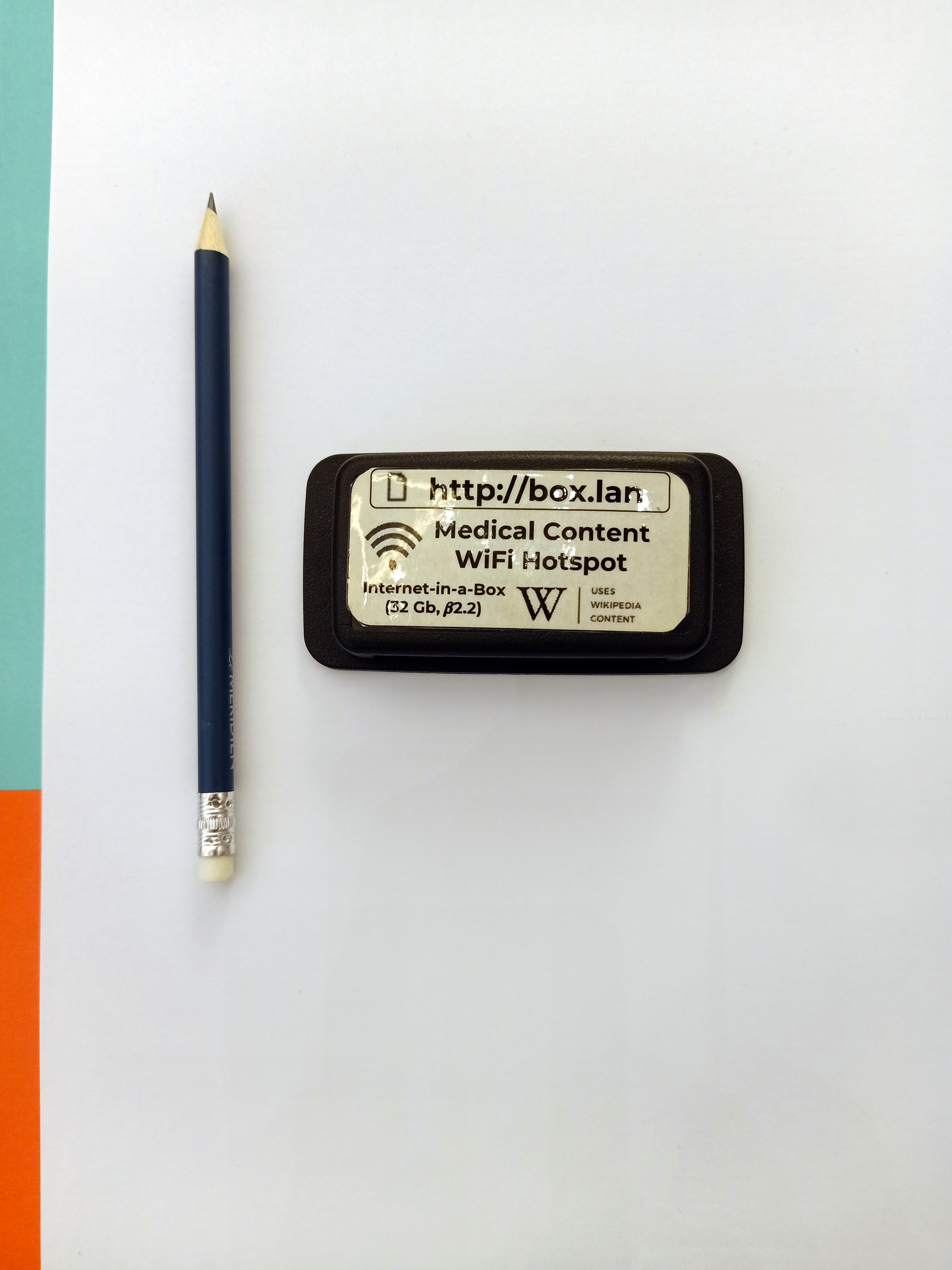
IIAB in ESEAP Conference 2024

== See also ==
- Meta: Internet-in-a-Box
- Kiwix
  - Afripedia Project
