= Independent Electricity Market Operator of the Philippines =

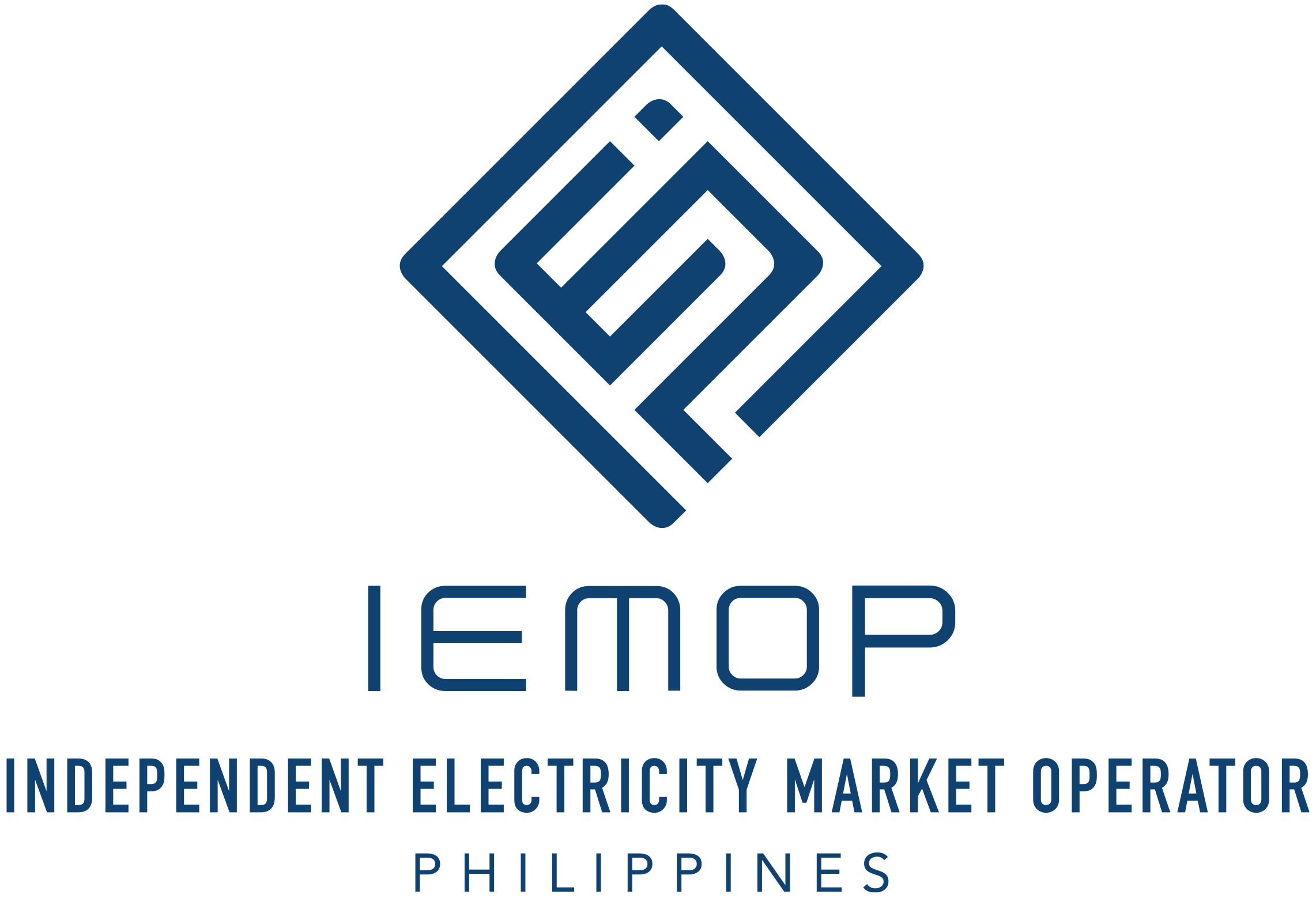
- Industry: Energy
- Founded: May 15, 2018; 8 years ago
- Headquarters: Pasig, Philippines
- Area served: Philippines
- Key people: Richard J. Nethercott, President and CEO; Robinson P. Descanzo, COO
- Products: Electricity Market Renewable Energy Market Retail Electricity Market
- Website: www.iemop.ph

The Independent Electricity Market Operator of the Philippines, Inc. (IEMOP) is a private, non-stock, non-profit corporation that functions as the market operator of the Wholesale Electricity Spot Market (WESM). It assumed WESM operations in September 2018. IEMOP's board of directors is composed of individuals independent from the power industry stakeholders and the government as mandated by the Electric Power Industry Reform Act (EPIRA).

== Legal Basis ==
IEMOP was incorporated in May 2018 upon the initiative of the Department of Energy (DOE) and the Philippine Electricity Market Corporation (PEMC) to be the Independent Market Operator (IMO) of the WESM. This is pursuant to Section 30 of Republic Act No. 9136, otherwise known as the Electric Power Industry Reform Act of 2001 (EPIRA). The establishment of an IMO was further reiterated in the Implementing Rules and Regulations of the EPIRA Rule 9, Section 6(a).

== History ==
The Philippine Electricity Market Corporation (PEMC) operated the WESM as the Market Operator until the transition to the IMO.

The transition to the Independent Market Operator (IMO) was implemented in 2018 upon the following issuances and actions. These two actions consist of the joining endorsement of the DOE and the electric power industry participants of the transition to an independent entity to become the IMO and transfer it to the market operator functions, assets, and liabilities from PEMC.

- Promulgation by the DOE of its Circular No. DC2018-01-0002 (17 January 2018) entitled "Adopting Policies for the Effective and Effective and Efficient Transition to the Independent Market Operator for the Wholesale Electricity Spot Market"
- Adoption by the Philippine Electricity Market Board and the general membership of the Philippine Electricity Market Corporation (PEMC) of the "Plan for Transition to the Independent Market Operator of the Wholesale Electricity Sport Market". This was adopted in a Special Membership Meeting of PEMC specially called for the purpose on 6 February 2019. The PEM Board and the PEMC membership, registered members of the WESM, represented the electric power industry participants.

Pursuant to the DOE Circular and IMO Transition Plan, an entity that is separate from PEMC and with no interest from any electric power industry participant was formed to become the IMO. This separate is the Independent Electricity Market Operator of the Philippines Inc. (IEMOP). IEMOP was incorporated under the Corporation Code of the Philippines as a private non-stock, non-profit corporation.

== Formation of the IMO and Organization of WESM Governing Body ==
- In implementing the transition, the DOE Circular No. DC2018-01-0002 called for, among other things, (a) the formation of the IMO and (b) for PEMC to remain as the governance arm or body of the WESM.
- The IMO is directed to be an entity, formed separate from PEMC and incorporated as a private corporation under the Corporation Code of the Philippines. It is further directed that no electric power industry participant shall hold any interest, whether directly or indirectly, in the IMO. It is to operate the integrated WESM and retail market on a non-profit basis.
- The Circular further directed that PEMC shall remain to be the WESM governing body and shall perform its functions as set out in the WESM Rules and market manuals. Its Board of Directors, be the Philippine Electricity Market Board (PEM Board), and the various governance committees shall perform their functions as set out in the rules.

== Incorporation of the IEMOP as IMO ==
- Pursuant to the above-described guidelines set out in the DOE Circular and implemented in the IMO Transition Plan, an entity that is separate from PEMC and with no interest from any electric power industry participant was formed to become the IMO.
- This separate is the Independent Electricity Market Operator of the Philippines Inc. (IEMOP). IEMOP was incorporated under the Corporation Code of the Philippines as a private non-stock, non-profit corporation. IEMOP was incorporated with the Primary Purpose, as follows:

Manage and operate the market for the wholesale purchase of electricity and ancillary services in the Philippines (the Wholesale Electricity Spot Market) and engage in services related to the same, in accordance with Republic Act No. 9136 including its implementing rules and regulations, the rules promulgated to govern the operations of the WESM (the “WESM Rules”), including their respective amendments and such other laws, rules and regulations which may be enacted hereafter that shall govern the WESM, and in an efficient, competitive, transparent and reliable manner, with the end in view of improving the trading, delivery and provision of electricity and ancillary services to the Philippine Electric Power Industry Participants.

== Nature and Qualifications of IEMOP ==
Separate and Independent Entity.

- Separate entity. Pursuant to the EPIRA that calls for the formation of an independent entity, IEMOP was incorporated separate from and is not affiliated with PEMC or any other electric power industry participants. Neither is it organized as a Government-Owned and Controlled Corporation (GOCC). IEMOP is thus separate and independent from any electric power industry participants and from the government.
- No interest from electric power industry participants. The formation of IEMOP complied with the requirements of the EPIRA Implementing Rules and Regulations (EPIRA-IRR) that expressly provide that no generation company, IPP administrator, distribution utility, or supplier shall have any interest, directly or indirectly, in the Market Operator. The corporation was incorporated by individuals that were independent of both the electric power industry participants and the government.
- Independent Board of Directors and Membership. In compliance likewise with the guidelines set out in the DOE Circular, all the members of the Board of Directors are independent of both the electric power industry participants and the government. The specific criteria for independence is set out in the DOE Circular and is adopted into the By-Laws of IEMOP. The Board of Directors of IEMOP, who are all required to be independent, make up the membership of the corporation as a non-stock, non-profit corporation. As such, IEMOP itself as a corporation is independent of both the electric power industry participants and the government. There is no electric power industry participant or any of their affiliates that have any interest, directly or indirectly, with IEMOP.

Technical and Financial Capability.

- Technical Capability. The IEMOP is staffed with former personnel from PEMC with experience in the market operations, pursuant to the DOE Circular requirement that all necessary personnel with experience in market operations shall be transferred from PEMC to IEMOP. Collectively, the personnel that were transferred from PEMC to IEMOP have been responsible for the day-to-day operations of the WESM since its commercial operations, and thus, brought with them the necessary expertise in market operations.
- Financial Capability. The WESM Rules require that the Market Operator operate the WESM on a non-profit basis. Meanwhile, the cost for the administration and operation of the WESM is directed by the EPIRA to be recovered from market fees or charge that will be imposed and collected from market participants. This effectively guarantees the financing of the operations of the WESM.

Note:The transition to IMO was held valid by the Supreme Court in G.R 25440 dated 23 March 2022. https://sc.judiciary.gov.ph/254440-independent-electricity-market-operator-of-the-philippines-inc-iemop-vs-energy-regulatory-commission/

== Current Leadership ==
To date, here are the current members of the IEMOP's board of directors:

- Lt. Gen. Ralph A. Villanueva (Ret.) – Chairman
- Atty. Richard J. Nethercott – Director
- Maria Carmela G. Cabading, FASP, FLMI, FICD – Director / Treasurer
- Engr. Rizalinda L. De Leon, Ph.D. – Director
- Engr. Jose Rodelio V. Mangulabnan – Director
- Johnny L. Tuason, CPA – Director
- Engr. Robinson P. Descanzo – Director

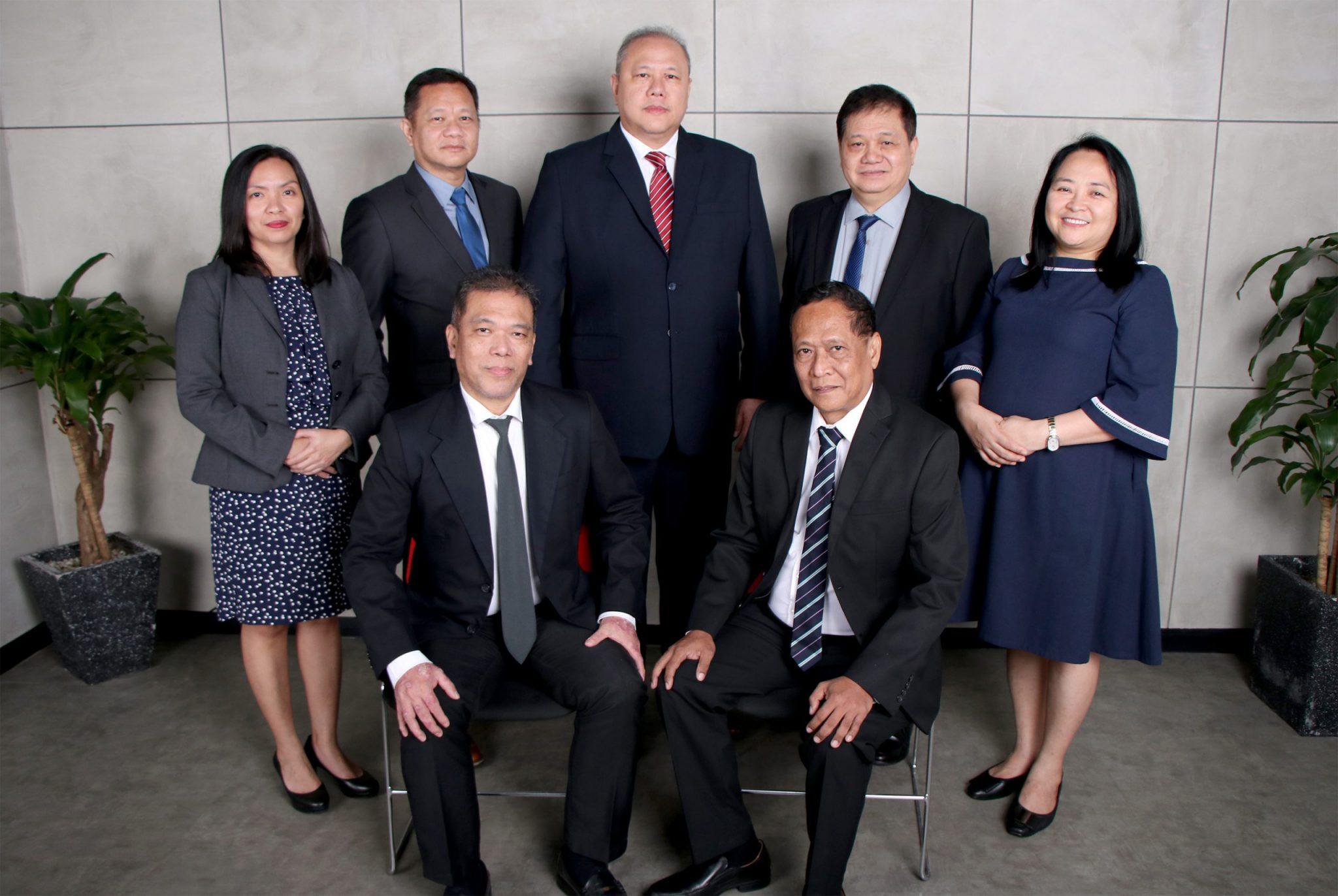
Management Team

== Management Team ==
As of January 2024, IEMOP's Management Team:

- Atty. Richard J. Nethercott – President and Chief Executive Officer
- Engr. Robinson P. Descanzo - Chief Operating Officer
- Atty. Sheryll M. Dy - VP, Legal Department
- Mr. Salvador D. Subaran - VP, Information Systems and Technology Department
- Engr. Isidro E. Cacho Jr. - VP, Trading Operations Department
- Engr. Arthur P. Pintado - VP, Internal Audit Department
- Ms. Mary Anne T. Santiago - VP, Finance
- Mr. Sherwin T. Casidsid, VP, Administration
