= Kiwix =

Free and open-source offline web browser

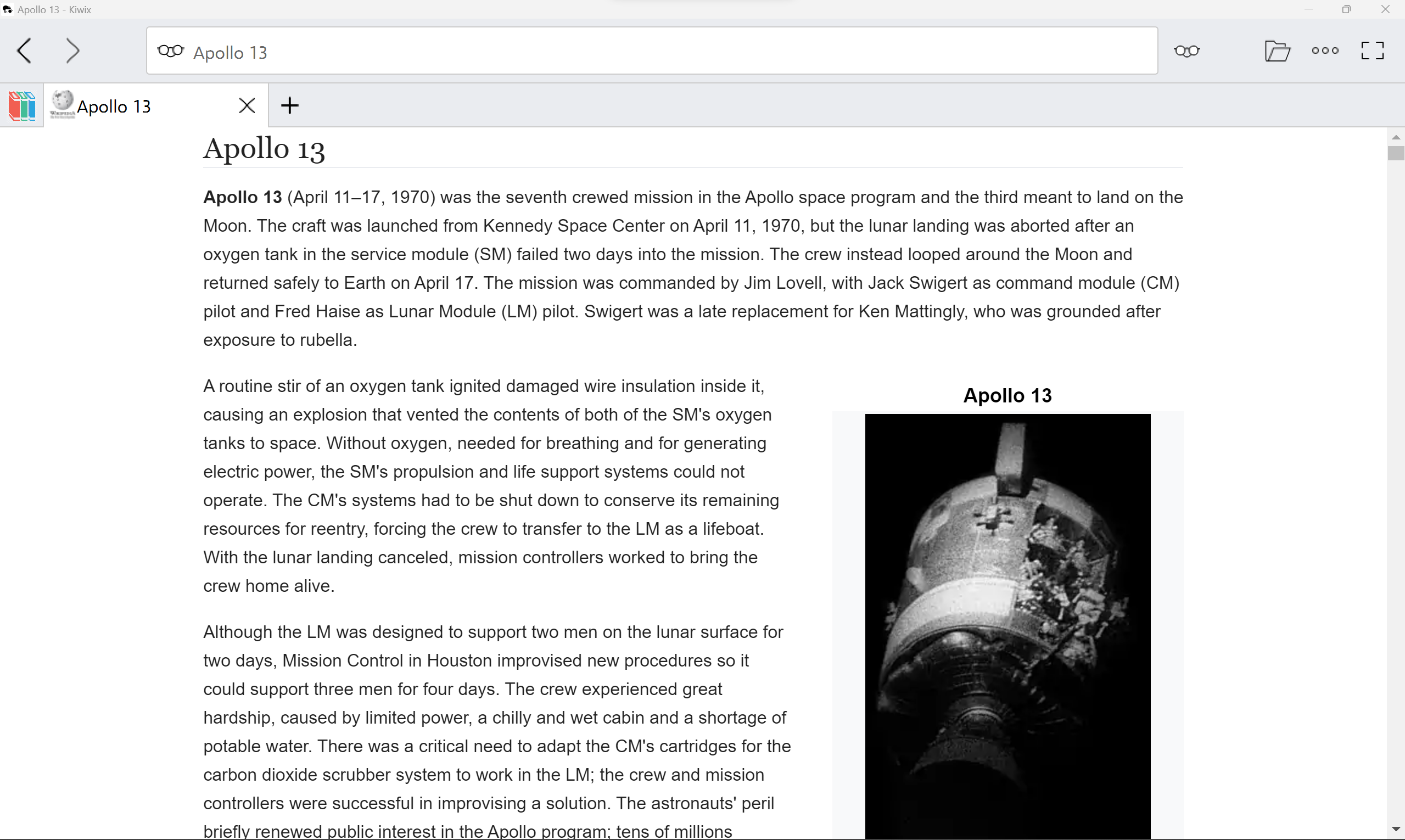
- Kiwix 2.3.1 running on Windows 11
- Developers: Emmanuel Engelhart; Renaud Gaudin

Stable release(s)
- Desktop: 2.5.1 / 4 January 2026; 8 months ago
- Android: 3.14.1 / 14 May 2026; 4 months ago
- iOS: 3.10.1 / 24 August 2025; 12 months ago
- Electron: 2.4.4 / 14 April 2023; 3 years ago
- UWP: 2.4.4 / 13 April 2023; 3 years ago
- Browsers: 3.6.0 / 12 November 2022; 3 years ago
- Written in: C++ (desktop), Kotlin (Android), Swift (iOS, macOS), JavaScript (browser, Electron, UWP)
- Operating system: Android, iOS, macOS, Windows, Linux, Windows 10 Mobile, Ubuntu Touch
- Size: Desktop: 121 MB; Electron: 71.1 MB; Android: 80 MB; iOS: 48.3 MB; UWP: 12.1 MB
- Available in: 100 languages
- License: GPLv3
- Website: www.kiwix.org
- Repository: github.com/kiwix/

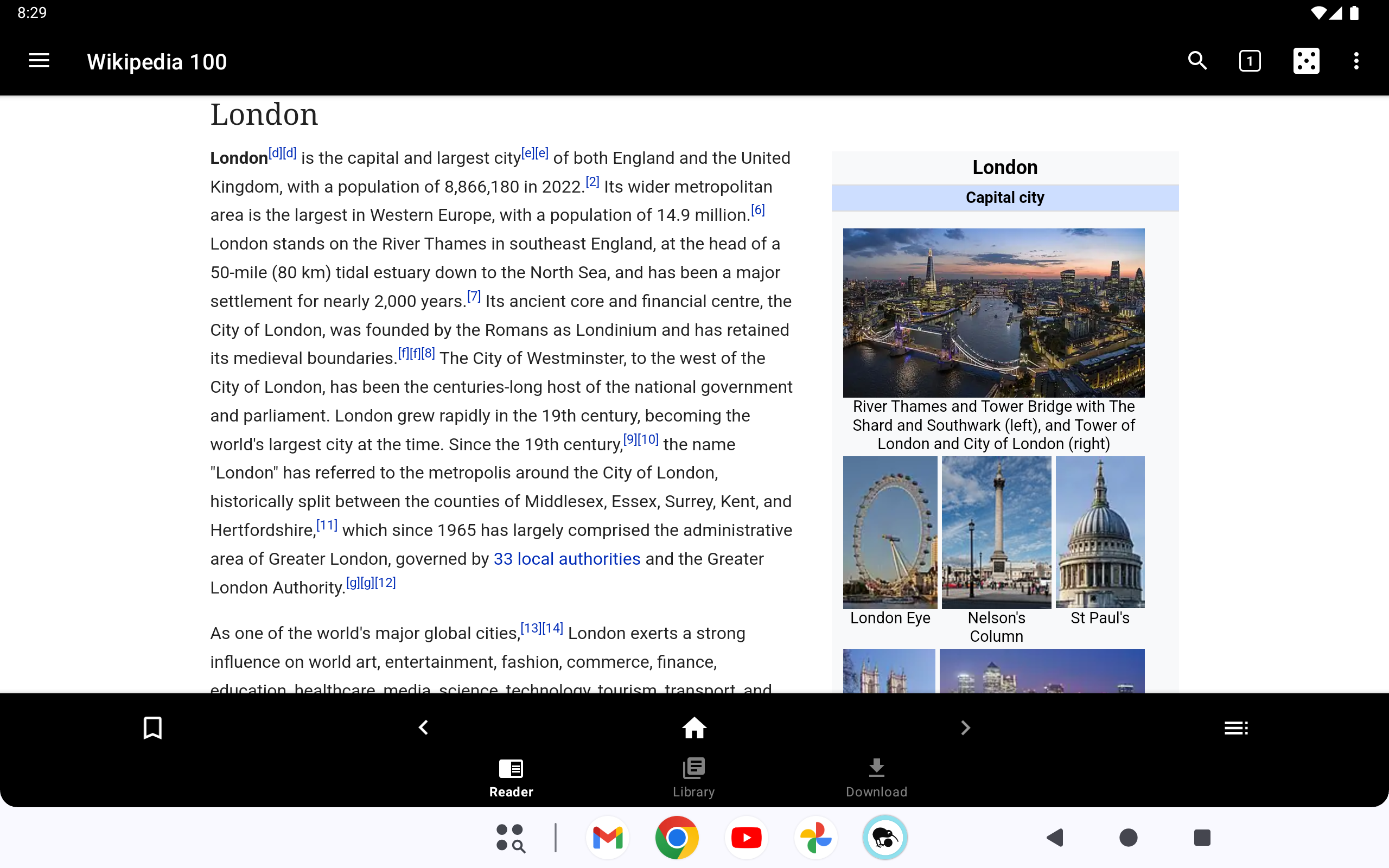
Kiwix app, running on an Android tablet

Kiwix is a free and open-source offline web browser created by Emmanuel Engelhart and Renaud Gaudin in 2007. It was first launched to enable offline access to Wikipedia, but has since expanded to include other projects from the Wikimedia Foundation, public domain texts from Project Gutenberg, many of the Stack Exchange sites, and many other resources. Available in more than 100 languages, Kiwix has been included in several high-profile projects, from smuggling operations in North Korea to Google Impact Challenge's recipient Bibliothèques Sans Frontières.

== History ==
Founder Emmanuel Engelhart sees Wikipedia as a common good, saying "The contents of Wikipedia should be available for everyone! Even without Internet access. This is why I have launched the Kiwix project."

After becoming a Wikipedia editor in 2004, Engelhart became interested in developing offline versions of Wikipedia. A project to make a Wikipedia CD, initiated in 2003, was a trigger for the project.

In 2012, Kiwix received a grant from Wikimedia France to build a kiwix-plug, which was deployed to universities in eleven countries known as the Afripedia Project. In February 2013 Kiwix won SourceForge's Project of the Month award and an open-source award in 2015.

== Description ==
The software is designed as an offline reader for a web content. It can be used on computers without an internet connection, computers with a slow or expensive connection, or to avoid censorship. It can also be used while travelling (e.g. on a plane or train). It also exists as browser extensions (see below). Of course, the content being archived offline means it is no longer editable, if it was previously.

Users first download Kiwix (or a browser extension), then download content for offline viewing with Kiwix. Compression saves disk space and bandwidth. All of English-language Wikipedia, with pictures, fits on a large USB stick or external media. (Note: 110 GB with pictures, 57 GB without pictures, and 7.4 GB with only the introduction, as of 13 November 2024.)

All content files are indexed and compressed in ZIM format, which makes them smaller, but leaves them easy to search and selectively decompress.

The ZIM files are then opened with Kiwix, which looks and behaves like a web browser, or with a suitably enabled conventional browser. Kiwix offers full text search, tabbed navigation, and the option to export articles to PDF and HTML.

There is an HTTP server version called kiwix-serve; this enables a computer to host Kiwix content, and make it available to other computers on a network. The other computers see an ordinary website.

Kiwix-hotspot is an HTTP server version for plug computers, which is often used to provide a Wi-Fi server. This is suitable for use cases where no technical skill is available; it is a "plug-and-play" solution.

== Available content ==
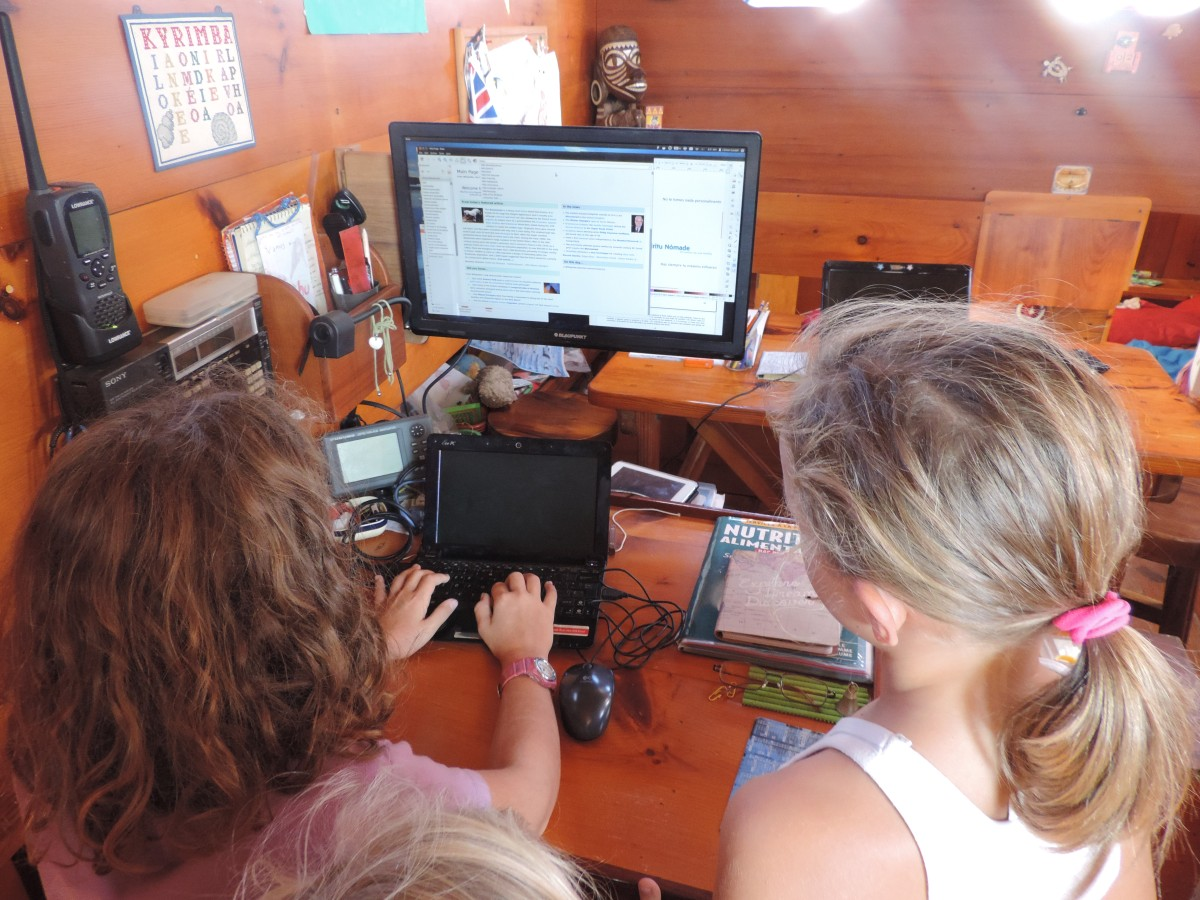
Reading Wikipedia through Kiwix on a boat in the South Pacific, where internet connectivity can be very expensive or nonexistent

A list of content available on Kiwix is available for download, including language-specific sublists. Content can be loaded through Kiwix itself.

Since 2014, most Wikipedia versions are available for download in various different languages. The project was unable to produce up-to-date complete versions of English Wikipedia after October 2018 but started making releases again in July 2020.

Besides Wikipedia, content from the Wikimedia Foundation such as Wikisource, Wikiquote, Wikivoyage, Wikibooks, and Wikiversity are also available for offline viewing in various different languages.

In November 2014, a ZIM version of all open texts forming part of Project Gutenberg was made available.

Besides public domain content, works licensed under a Creative Commons license are available for download as well. For example, offline versions of the Ubuntu wiki containing user documentation for the Ubuntu operating system, ZIM editions of TED conference talks and videos from Crash Course are available in the Kiwix archive as ZIM file formats.

=== Historic Wikipedia articles selection releases ===
Between 2007 and 2011, three CD/DVD versions containing a selection of articles from the English Wikipedia were released. They are now available as Kiwix ZIM files:

- Wikipedia Version 0.5
- Wikipedia Version 0.7
- Wikipedia Version 0.8

In May 2022, an English-language Wikipedia dump was published by the Kiwix Project, which contains all articles, complete with data-files present in the articles, taken before the spread of LLM technologies.

== Deployments ==
Kiwix can be installed on a desktop computer as a stand-alone program, installed on a tablet or smartphone, or can create its own WLAN environment from a Raspberry Pi.

As a software development project, Kiwix itself is not directly involved in deployment projects. However, third party organizations do use the software as a component of their own projects. Examples include:

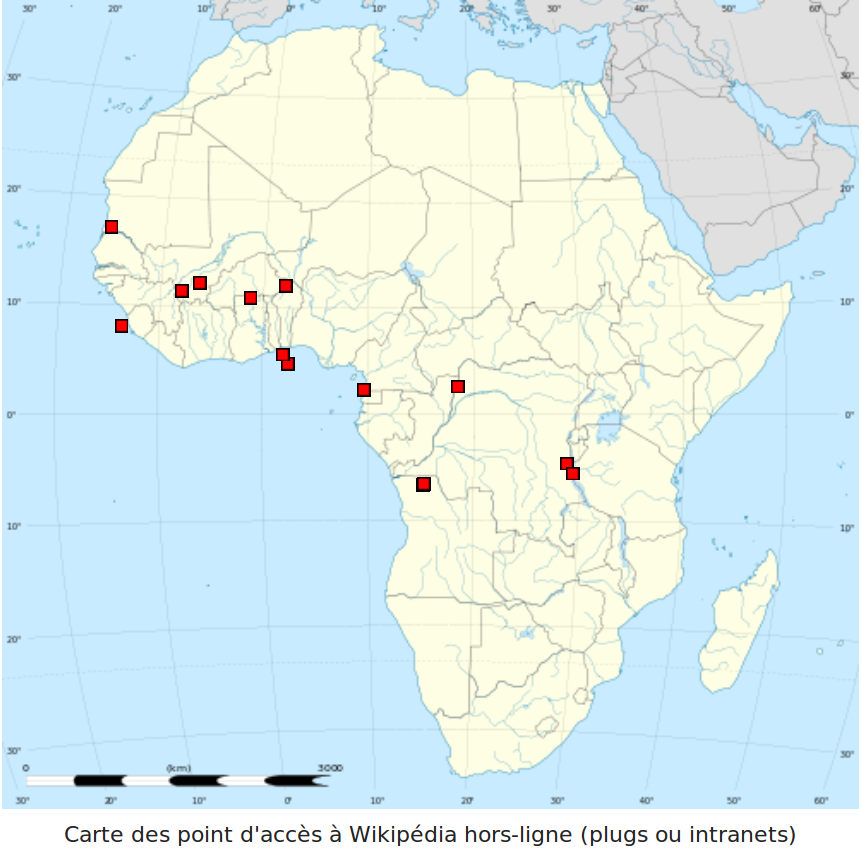
Locations of 13 universities in 11 countries where Kiwix was deployed as part of the Afripedia Project

- Universities and libraries that cannot afford broadband Internet access.
  - The Afripedia Project set up kiwix servers in French-speaking universities, some of them with no Internet access, in 11 African countries.
- Schools in developing countries, where access to the internet is difficult or too expensive.
  - Installed on computers used for the One Laptop per Child project.
  - Installed on Raspberry Pis for use in schools with no easy access to electricity in Tanzania by the Tanzania Development Trust.
  - Installed on tablets in schools in Mali as part of the MALebooks project.
  - Used by school teachers and university professors, as well as students, in Senegal.
  - Deployed in Benin during teacher training seminars run by Zedaga, a Swiss NGO specialized in education.
  - The Fondation Orange has used kiwix-serve in its own French language technological knowledge product they have deployed in Africa.
  - A special version for the organization SOS Children's Villages was developed, initially for developing countries, but it is also used in the developed world.
- At sea and in other remote areas:
  - Aboard ships in Antarctic waters.
  - By the Senegalese Navy in their patrol ships.
  - Included in Navigatrix, a Linux distribution for people on boats.
- On a train or plane.
- In European and US prison education programs.

=== Package managers and app stores ===
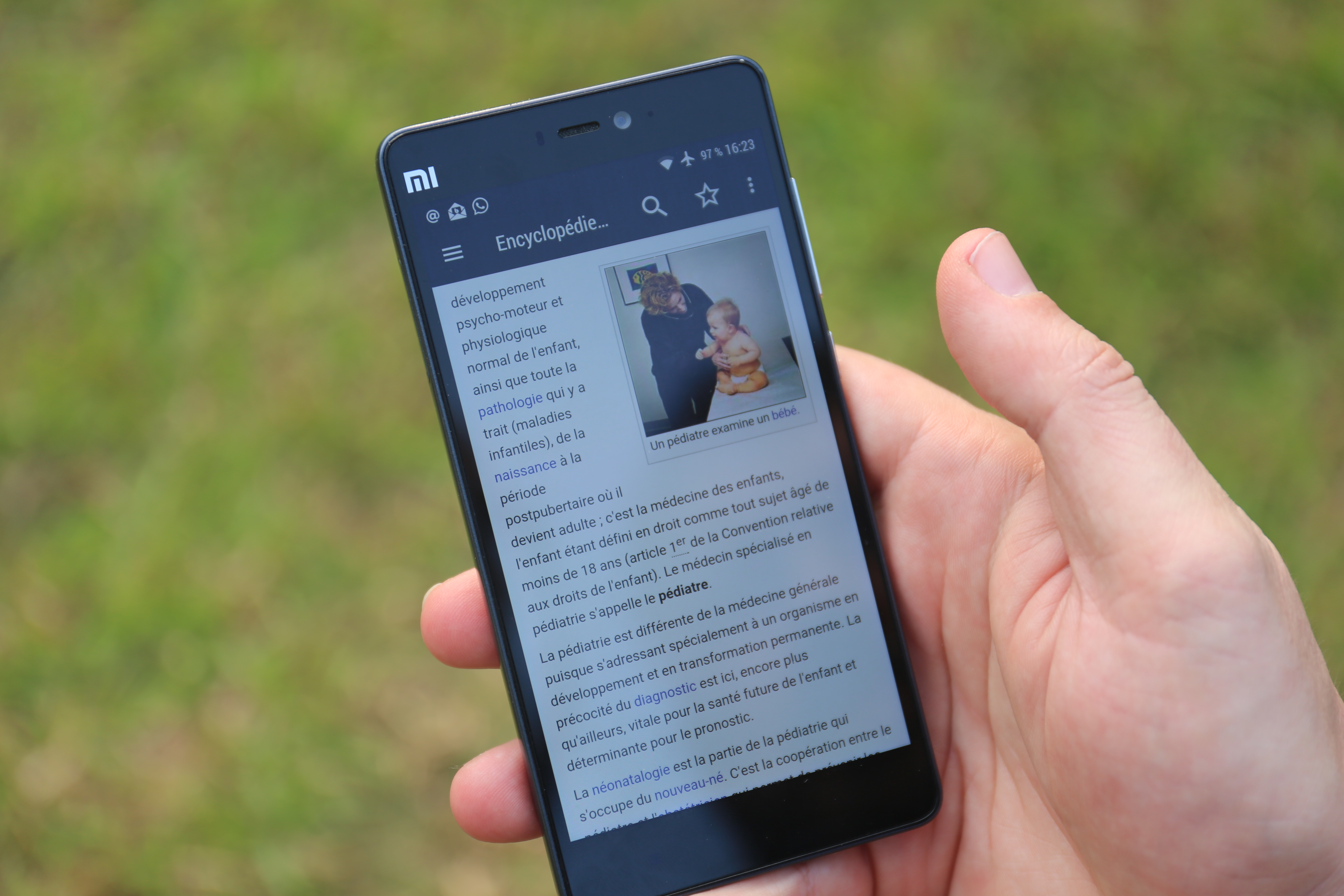
Medical Wikipedia app on a smartphone

Kiwix is available in the native package managers of most Linux distributions. From 2014 to 2020, it was absent, due to XULRunner, a program on which Kiwix depended, being deprecated by Mozilla and removed from the package databases.

Kiwix is available on Debian and Debian-based distributions, such as Ubuntu and Linux Mint, Fedora and other RPM-based distributions, such as openSUSE, and on the Sugar, Arch Linux, and NixOS distributions. A distribution-independent Flatpak version is also available. It is also available on Android. Kiwix JS UWP and Electron packages are available in the native Windows package manager winget.

Kiwix is available in the Microsoft Store, on Google Play, and Apple's iOS App Store. It is also available as an installable HTML5 app (Kiwix JS) in the form of browser extensions for Firefox and Chromium (Chrome, Edge) and as a Progressive Web Application (PWA), all of which work offline. Electron packages of the HTML5 app are compiled for Windows and popular Linux distributions. Since 2015, a series of "customized apps" have also been released, of which Medical Wikipedia and PhET simulations are the two largest.

== See also ==
- GoldenDict supports the ZIM file format since 2013, including offline use (except on Android) and the ability to create full-text indices.
- XOWA
- Internet-in-a-Box
