= ZIM (file format) =

Open file format that stores wiki content for offline usage

ZIM archive format
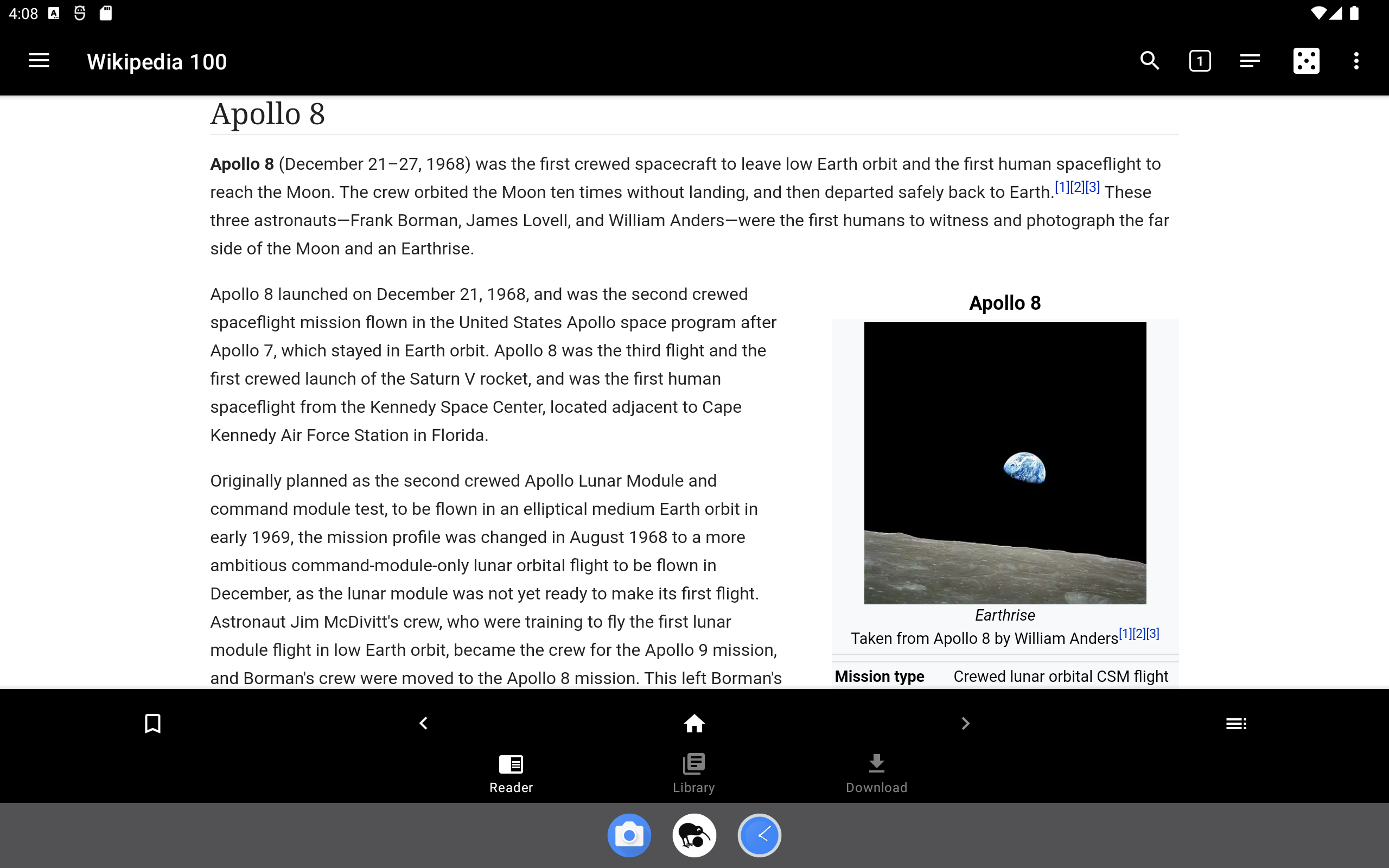
- Kiwix ZIM reader on an Android-powered tablet showing the article from Wikipedia for Schools in offline usage
- Filename extension: .zim
- Internet media type: text/plain, application/octet-stream
- Magic number: 0x44D495A
- Latest release: 6.3; April 16, 2025; 16 months ago
- Type of format: Data compression
- Compression: Zstandard, LZMA2
- Container for: Wikimedia and other web content for offline use
- Open format?: Yes
- Free format?: Yes
- Website: https://wiki.openzim.org/wiki/OpenZIM

The ZIM file format is an open file format that stores website content for offline usage. The format is defined by the openZIM project, which also supports an open-source ZIM reader called Kiwix. The format is primarily used to store the contents of Wikipedia and other Wikimedia projects, including articles, full-text search indices and auxiliary files.

ZIM is an abbreviation for 'Zeno improved', as it replaced the earlier Zeno file format. Since 2021, the library defaults to Zstandard file compression, and also supports LZMA2 compression, as implemented by the XZ Utils library. Most notably, the compression ratio can be up to 3∶1 with almost all of the space savings taking place within the clusters.

== See also ==
- WARC (file format)
