= M-learning =

Distance education using mobile device technology

M-learning, or mobile learning, is defined as "learning across multiple contexts, through social and content interactions, using personal electronic devices" It is a form of distance education or technology-enhanced active learning where learners use portable devices such as mobile phones to learn anywhere and anytime. Reviews of 97 studies published between 2014 and 2023 show that well-planned mobile learning can improve engagement, knowledge, and skills at different education levels. The portability that mobile devices provide allows for learning anywhere, hence the term "mobile" in "mobile learning". M-learning devices include computers, MP3 players, mobile phones, and tablets. M-learning can be an important part of informal learning.

M-learning allows educational content to be accessed from a wide range of locations, depending on network availability. It allows for the instant sharing of feedback and tips since mobile devices are often connected to the internet. M-learning also offers strong portability by replacing books and notes with small devices filled with tailored learning content. Moreover, it has the added benefit of being cost-effective, as the price of digital content on tablets is falling sharply compared to traditional media such as books, CDs, DVDs, etc. For example, a digital textbook costs one-third to half the price of a paper textbook, with zero marginal cost.

According to Fombona, Pascual-Sevillana, and González-Videgaray, this methodology offers various possibilities, including greater and different access to information. It also introduces significant innovations, such as the increase in informal and playful activities, iconic virtual membership, and networks of friendly interaction within new scales of values.

== Background ==
Mobile learning is seen as either the "delivery" of education, or the "provision" of support on mobile phones, PDAs, or tablets. New mobile technology, such as hand-held-based devices, is playing a large role in redefining how people receive and process information.

=== History ===
Concepts of m-learning were introduced by Alan Kay in the 1970s when he joined Xerox Corporation's Palo Alto Research Center and formed a group to develop the "Dynabook," a portable and hands-on personal computer. The aim was to provide children with access to the digital world. However, this project eventually failed due to a lack of technological support at that time. In 1994, Mitsubishi Electric Corp. created the first smartphone called IBM Simon, which was defined as a handheld personal communicator. Following this, various technological companies began designing what we now know as "smartphones". The creation of smartphones laid the foundation for mobile learning, and subsequent innovations in mobile devices propelled mobile learning into the realm of projects and research.

Mobile learning is defined as "learning across multiple contexts, through social and content interactions, using personal electronic devices". It originally focused on the type of mobile device, but then changed to focus on learning with the devices. Now, with AI mobile learning includes extended reality, and learning analytics, aiming for personalized and immersive experiences. Later mlearning research phases also adopted theoretical models such as TAM, UTAUT, and TCCM to analyze learner behavior and implementation contexts. In its second phase, around 2005, a tremendous number of projects have been completed, four major projects are "The Leonardo da Vinci project From e-learning to m-learning led by Ericsson Education Dublin", "The Leonardo da Vinci project Mobile learning: the next generation of learning led by Ericsson Education Dublin", "The IST project M-Learning led by the United Kingdom government Learning and Skills Development Agency (LSDA)" and "The IST project MOBILearn led by Giunti Ricerca of Genoa, Italy". These projects are mainly targeted on the effects of m-learning, like motivation to learn, engagement in learning activities, and focus on special needs people; they set the tone for mobile learning, and m-learning is prepared to transfer from project status to mainstream education and training.

Currently, m-learning research has become globalised, with Africa, Asia, North America, Europe, Scandinavia, Australia, and New Zealand all making achievements in this field.

== Approaches ==
The use of mobile learning in the military is becoming increasingly common due to low cost and high portability.

=== Classroom ===
Parts of Group Collaboration

Applications in classrooms and other learning spaces combine the use of handheld computers, PDAs, smartphones, or handheld voting systems (such as clickers) with traditional resources.

==== Class management ====
Mobile devices in brick-and-mortar classrooms can be used to enhance student-centered learning and group collaboration among students through communication applications, interactive displays, quick response codes, and video features.

- Existing mobile technology can replace cumbersome resources such as textbooks, visual aids, and presentation technology.] In higher education, mobile learning improves student engagement, but barriers such as infrastructure, cost, and instructor readiness remain critical.
- Interactive and multi-mode technology allows students to engage and manipulate information.
- Mobile Device features with WIFI capabilities allow for on-demand access to information.
- Access to classroom activities and information on mobile devices provides a continuum for learning inside and outside the classroom. Systematic reviews confirm that mobile access enhances learning engagement and bridges formal and informal education spaces.

In a literature review conducted by FutureLab, researchers found that increased communication, collaboration, and understanding of concepts were a result of mobile technology applications.

=== Distance learning ===
Mobile devices can be used in online settings to enhance learning experiences.

- The mobile phone (through text SMS notices) can be used especially for distance education or with students whose courses require them to be highly mobile, particularly to communicate information regarding the availability of assignment results, venue changes, and cancellations, etc. This also enables bite-sized or microlearning content, short learning modules of 2-10 minutes delivered over mobile platforms, allowing retention through spaced practice and just-in-time application.
- Mobile devices facilitate online interaction between teachers and students, and among peers, enabling real-time collaboration, self-assessment, and reflective learning. Recent research highlights that mobile learning enhances collaboration and allows personalized pacing, especially when combined with interactive apps and cloud-based platforms.
- It can also be of value to business people, such as sales representatives, who do not wish to waste time away from their busy schedules to attend formal training events.

=== Podcasting ===
Podcasting consists of listening to audio recordings of lectures. In higher education, podcasting fosters asynchronous access, supports informal review, and increases flexibility for remote learners using mobile devices. It can be used to review live lectures and to provide opportunities for students to rehearse oral presentations. Podcasts may also provide supplemental information to enhance traditional lectures.

Psychological research suggests that university students who download podcast lectures achieve substantially higher exam results than those who attend the lecture in person (only in cases in which students take notes).

Podcasts may be delivered using syndication, although this method of delivery is not always easily adopted.

=== Work ===
M-learning in the context of work can encompass various forms of learning. It has been defined as the "processes of coming to know, and of being able to operate successfully in, and across, new and ever-changing contexts, including learning for, at and through work, by utilising mobile devices".

- M-learning for work
- M-learning at and through work
- Cross-contextual m-learning

Learning for work, also known as 'just-in-case' learning, involves traditional and formal educational activities, such as training courses, that prepare learners for future work-related tasks. A typical corporate application is the delivery of mobile compliance training, which can effectively reach geographically mobile employees like consultants or staff in logistics and transport systems. Another application is mobile simulations that prepare learners for future situations, such as real-time SMS-based simulations for disaster response training.

Learning at and through work, labeled as "just-in-time" mobile learning, occurs in informal educational settings within the workplace. Studies suggest these approaches improve employee problem-solving, and simulation-based mobile training enhances disaster response preparedness. Employees can use mobile phones and handheld devices to solve problems on the spot, for example, by accessing informational resources like checklists and reference guides before customer visits or mobile decision support systems. The latter is particularly popular in clinical settings, where they assist highly mobile medical staff in making decisions regarding complex patient cases using rule-based algorithms. Their application has been associated with learning and, specifically, with improving the practice of medical staff. Mobile-social learning platforms have been shown to strengthen professional collaboration, especially in low-resource contexts such as healthcare, where mobile peer networks help practitioners access expert input, training updates, and clinical decision support. Learning through work also occurs through interaction with distant peers via phone. "People tagging" is an approach where individuals assign topics to their co-workers. The aggregation of interests and experiences serves as a means to raise awareness and locate competent experts when needed, particularly with context-sensitive expert location systems.

Cross-contextual learning, which bridges the gap between work settings and formal education formats, holds significant potential for work-based mobile learning, especially within tertiary education systems. This involves approaches where learning in the workplace is facilitated and supported (e.g., through formative assessments, reflective questions, or the documentation of personal achievements in multimedia learning diaries or portfolios. The materials created in this process are later utilised in more formal educational formats, such as classrooms or discussions with tutors. The value of these mobile phone-mediated learning practices lies in the integration and harmonisation of work-based learning and formal education experiences, which otherwise tend to remain separate.

=== Lifelong learning and self-learning ===
Mobile technologies and approaches, i.e. mobile-assisted language learning (MALL), are also used to assist in language learning. Among refugees, MALL has been instrumental in learning host country languages, especially during crises like COVID-19, when traditional classes were inaccessible. For instance handheld computers, cell phones, and podcasting have been used to help people acquire and develop language skills.

=== Other ===
- Improving levels of literacy, numeracy, and participation in education amongst young adults.
- Using the communication features of a mobile phone as part of a larger learning activity, e.g.: sending media or texts into a central portfolio, or exporting audio files from a learning platform to one's phone (known as mobile literacy).
- Developing workforce skills and readiness among youth and young adults.

== For refugees ==
Refugees are confronted several individual challenges that can negatively impact their learning and teaching opportunities, as well as their lives beyond the learning environment. Mobile solutions play a key role in enhancing refugees' informal learning. Educational apps for refugees should incorporate features like multilingual support, offline access, culturally relevant content, and psychological support to address trauma and identity struggles. For instance, a systematic review identified 14 mobile learning applications designed for refugee education, most of which prioritize language learning, multimedia use, and community integration. Technology provides support for refugees' informal learning in the following challenges:

- Lack of language and literacy skills in host countries;
- Trauma and identity struggles;
- Disorientation in new environments;
- Exclusion and isolation.

== Around the world ==
=== Finland ===
The Finnish National Core Curriculum for Basic Education was renewed in 2014. Considering the increasing significance of technology as both an objective and a means of learning, ICT and mobile learning were integrated into the new National Core Curriculum as a transversal competence that is present in all learning and teaching.

PaikkaOppi (which roughly means 'learning of places') is a Finnish educational innovation supporting open science and the information society. It is an open web-based learning environment for geographic information system (GIS) usage in schools. Moreover, it is a potential spearhead in national policy for the development of skills and education by integrating disciplines and promoting the use of mobile learning. Students are able to view, analyze and share their data collaboratively or individually with browser-based map applications. Mobile applications for Android and iOS devices are for saving personal data in the field trips or at home. Being accessible to all users free of charge, PaikkaOppi is very widely used at schools, home and on free time as well. The service supports teaching the core curricula: competences for spatial citizenship, multi-literacy skills, logical thinking, and problem solving skills. The service is being used all over the country as a project platform for several school subjects and multidisciplinary learning modules from primary schools to upper secondary.

=== Pakistan ===
In Pakistan, the Rehan School was one of the first initiatives to offer remote courses that could be accessed from a basic mobile phone. The application offers short educational sequences, showing how to write common names and words and conveying mathematical and scientific concepts. Sometimes featuring television personalities, the teaching sketches are intended for viewing on small telephone screens. The films are sold for a few cents in the telecoms boutiques and can then be exchanged by Bluetooth. The Rehan School estimates that over 40,000 individuals follow its lessons, but the real number is certainly higher.

=== Papua New Guinea ===
In Papua New Guinea, the SMS Story project has improved teachers' classroom practices in teaching children to read by using short messages and sent by SMS.

=== Sub-Saharan Africa ===
Since the 1960s, various information and communication technologies have aroused strong interest in Sub-Saharan Africa as a way of increasing access to education, and enhancing its quality and fairness. In Sub-Saharan Africa, teachers and students are faced with an extreme shortage of teaching materials. The number of textbooks available are limited, so few students have individual access to textbooks in class or at home. Given the shortage of textbooks in many African schools, tablets and mobile phones are being viewed by governments and international organizations as a solution to provide access to learning materials. Despite enthusiasm, adoption is hindered by infrastructural limitations, as identified in a scoping review covering 32 studies in low-resource nations. In one example, the Tangerine mobile assessment and coaching system, deployed in Kenya, aims to help teachers in their assessment activities. With Tangerine, a student's reading level can be evaluated by recording the student's answers on a mobile phone or a tablet. The data gathered by the application also allows comparisons of the learning levels of students according to their age, geographical area and gender.

== Analysis ==
=== Effectiveness ===
A recent study on health professions education combined evidence from 29 studies, which included 3175 learners, and concluded that mLearning is as effective as traditional learning in terms of improving learners' knowledge and skill. However, studies on refugee learners showed that although users appreciated mobile platforms, they did not always correlate with improved academic performance. The study highlights that mLearning is a novel educational strategy that is rapidly developing in the field of health professions education; in "21 of the 29 included studies (72%) published between 2014 and 2017, it's clear that mLearning is an emerging educational strategy. The remaining 8 studies were published between 2006 and 2013, with no studies published before 2006, further highlighting the modern nature of this approach to health professions education and its relevance."

=== Value ===
Tutors who have used m-learning programs and techniques have made the following value statements in favor of m-learning.

- It is important to bring new technology into the classroom.
- The devices used are more lightweight than books and PCs.
- Mobile learning can be used to diversify the types of learning activities students partake in (or a blended learning approach). The Technology Acceptance Model (TAM) and Unified Theory of Acceptance and Use of Technology (UTAUT) have been widely used to understand learner attitudes toward m-learning.
- Mobile learning supports the learning process rather than being integral to it.
- Mobile learning can be a useful add-on tool for students with special needs. However, for SMS and MMS, this might be dependent on the student's specific disabilities or difficulties involved.
- Mobile learning can be used as a 'hook' to re-engage disaffected youth.
- M-Learning can be designed to combine decision-making in complex learning scenarios with formative scoring and assessment.
- Mobile Learning courses can be accessed either online or offline.

==== Benefits ====
Sources:

- Relatively inexpensive opportunities, as the cost of mobile devices, are significantly less than PCs and laptops. Also, facilitates collaboration, critical thinking, and skill development through interactive, context-aware applications and social learning networks.
- Multimedia content delivery and creation options
- Continuous and situated learning support
- Decrease in training costs
- Potentially a more rewarding learning experience
- New opportunities for traditional educational institutions
- Readily available a/synchronous learning experience
- Decrease in textbook costs
- Access to personalized content. Personalization features, such as language selection, content pacing, and interactive elements, improve learner engagement and outcomes.
- Remote access to knowledge
- Improved literacy levels

=== Characterization ===
- It can get access to information and educational experience faster than other media. M-learning offers real-time access to educational content, enabling personalized and context-aware learning experiences.
- It is supported by portable devices, its mobility makes it easy to use.
- Compared to other methods of learning, the cost of M-learning is relatively low.
- The exchange of information can be encrypted or private.
- It is easy to access all kinds of information.

=== Aspects ===
Along with the development of m-learning, many theories about mobile educations are raised by researchers, major aspects are listed.

- Mobile learning uses mobile technology and is portable.
- Mobile learning is a continuation and extension of e-learning.
- Mobile learning is learner-centered, "The learner plays an active role from determination of the goals until the evaluation stage" Current frameworks also emphasize contextual sensitivity, adaptive feedback through analytics, and integration of formal and informal learning spaces.

=== Challenges ===
==== Technical challenges ====
- Internet connectivity and battery life
- Screen size and key size
- Meeting required bandwidth for nonstop/fast streaming
- Number of file/asset formats supported by a specific device
- Content security or copyright issue from authoring group
- Multiple standards, multiple screen sizes, multiple operating systems
- Reworking existing E-Learning materials for mobile platforms. Design must emphasize user-friendly interfaces, culturally appropriate content, and technical robustness for success.
- Limited memory
- Risk of sudden obsolescence
- Security
- Work/life balance
- Cost of investment

Social and educational challenges

- Accessibility and cost barriers for end users: digital divide.
- How to assess learning outside the classroom
- How to support learning across many contexts. In resource-constrained countries, barriers such as unstable internet, cost, and lack of local language content hinder mobile learning adoption.
- Content's security or copyright infringement issues
- Frequent changes in device models/technologies/functionality etc.
- Developing an appropriate theory of learning for the mobile age. Despite significant adoption, a unified pedagogical framework for m-learning remains underdeveloped, limiting consistent implementation strategies across institutions.
- Conceptual differences between e-learning and m-learning
- Design of technology to support a lifetime of learning
- Tracking of results and proper use of this information
- No restriction on learning timetable
- Personal and private information and content
- No demographic boundary
- Disruption of students' personal and academic lives
- Access to and use of the technology in developing countries
- Risk of distraction
- Mobile usage habits among different countries and regions

=== Growth ===
Mobile learning is widely used in schools, workplaces, museums, cities and rural areas around the world. A 2024 review of 161 studies showed exponential growth in mobile learning post-2016, with rising usage in both formal and informal educational settings. In comparison to traditional classroom pedagogical approaches, mobile learning allows widened opportunities for timing, location, accessibility and context of learning.

Current areas of growth include:

- Testing, surveys, job aids and just-in-time (J.I.T.) learning
- Location-based and contextual learning
- Social-networked mobile learning
- Mobile educational gaming
- Delivering m-Learning to cellular phones using two way SMS messaging and voice-based CellCasting (podcasting to phones with interactive assessments)
- Cloud computer file storage

== See also ==
- Educational technology – Use of technology in education to enhance learning and teaching
- Instructional simulation – Type of simulation
- mHealth – Medicine and public health supported by mobile devices
- Mobile phone use in schools
- Offline mobile learning
- Smartphone – Handheld mobile device

== Sources ==
- This article incorporates text from a free content work. Licensed under CC-BY-SA IGO 3.0 (license statement/permission). Text taken from Digital Services for Education in Africa, UNESCO, UNESCO. UNESCO.
- This article incorporates text from a free content work. Licensed under CC BY-SA 3.0 IGO. Text taken from A Lifeline to learning: leveraging mobile technology to support education for refugees, UNESCO, UNESCO. UNESCO.
