= Wikimedian of the Year =

Annual award honoring and celebrating Wikimedia contributors

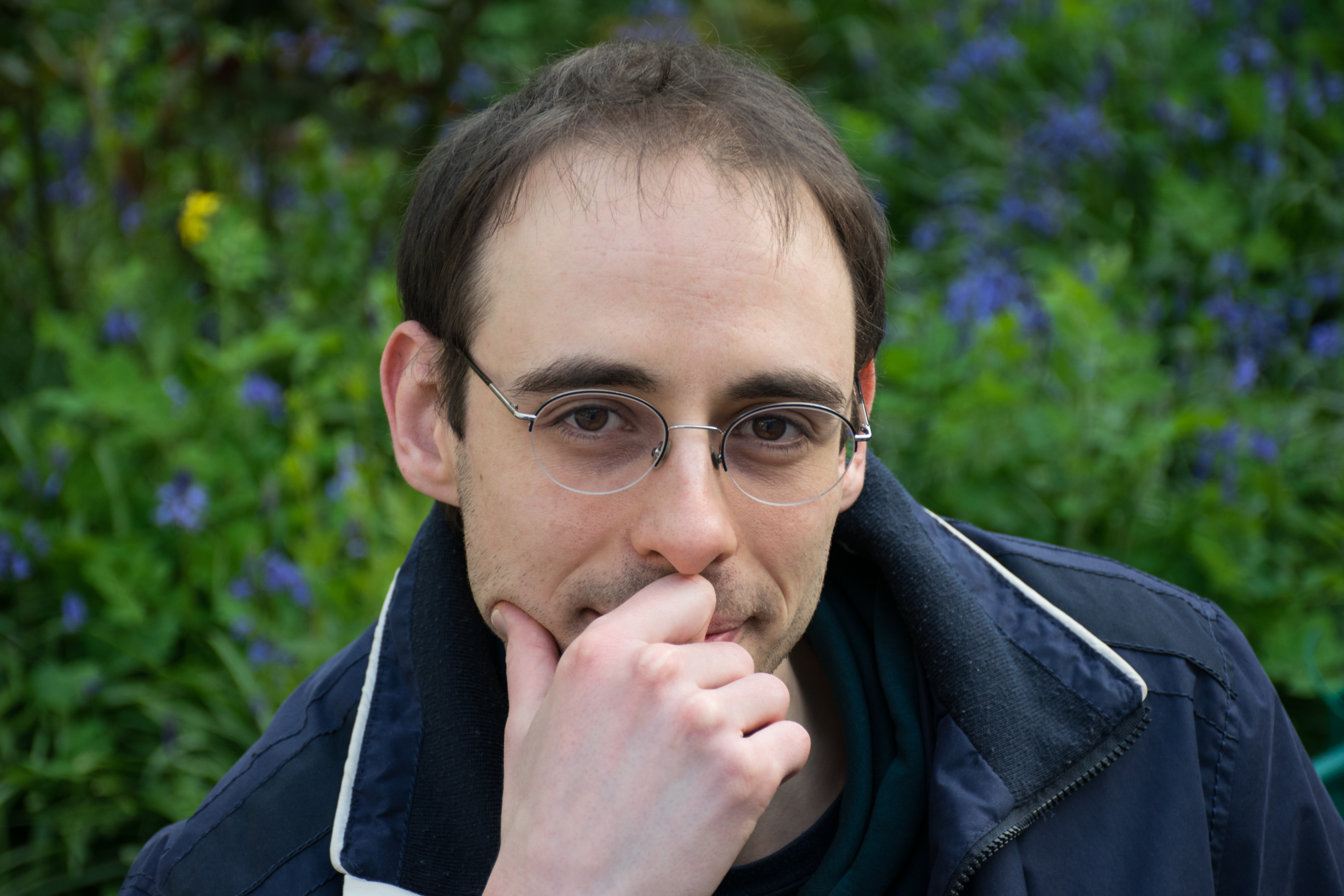
- 2026 Wikimedian of the Year recipient, Jules Xénard
- Awarded for: Major achievements within the Wikimedia movement
- Location: Traditionally presented at Wikimania
- Presented by: Jimmy Wales
- Formerly called: Wikipedian of the Year
- First award: August 2011; 15 years ago

The Wikimedian of the Year is an annual award that honors Wikipedia editors and other contributors to Wikimedia projects to highlight major achievements within the Wikimedia movement, established in August 2011 by Wikipedia's co-founder Jimmy Wales. Wales selects the recipients and honors them at Wikimania, an annual conference of the Wikimedia Foundation—except in 2020, 2021, and 2022 when the recipients were announced at online meetings as a consequence of the COVID-19 pandemic. From 2011 to 2016, the award was named Wikipedian of the Year.

== History ==
In 2011, the first title was given to Rauan Kenzhekhanuly for his work on Kazakh Wikipedia. The following year, it was awarded to an editor identified as "Demmy" for creating a bot to translate 15,000 short English articles into Yoruba, a language spoken in Nigeria. In 2013, Rémi Mathis of Wikimédia France and the French Wikipedia was named for his role in an article controversy. In 2014, the award was given posthumously to Ukrainian journalist Ihor Kostenko, who actively promoted the Ukrainian Wikipedia on social networking sites and was killed during a protest. Wales named an undisclosed recipient in 2015, and hopes someday to tell their story. In 2016, the first joint award was presented to Emily Temple-Wood and Rosie Stephenson-Goodknight for their efforts to combat harassment on Wikipedia and increase its coverage of women. Other recipients include Felix Nartey in 2017, Farhad Fatkullin in 2018, Emna Mizouni in 2019, Sandister Tei in 2020, Alaa Najjar in 2021, Olga Paredes in 2022, Taufik Rosman in 2023, and the youngest recipient, Hannah Clover, in 2024.

In addition to the main award, Susanna Mkrtchyan and Satdeep Gill were the first to receive honorable mentions in 2015 which continued until 2018. In 2021, the honorable mention award was re-introduced, but with a focus on affiliate staff or officers.

The award was expanded in 2021 with additional categories including Media Contributor of the Year, Newcomer of the Year, Tech Contributor of the Year, and Wikimedia Laureate. In 2024, an additional category of Functionary of the Year was added.

== Lists of award recipients ==
=== Wikimedian of the Year (formerly Wikipedian of the Year) ===
List of Wikimedian of the Year winners
Year	Image	Recipient	Principal project	Rationale	Ref.
2011	A man with a dotted shirt and small hair and smiling.	Rauan Kenzhekhanuly	Kazakh Wikipedia	Kenzhekhanuly recruited a stable community to improve the Kazakh Wikipedia, which, in a year, increased from 4 to over 200 active editors, and 7,000 to 130,000 articles. Wales was criticized by fellow Wikipedians because of Kenzhekhanuly's ties to the government of Kazakhstan, and stated on Reddit in 2015 that he had been unaware of Kenzhekhanuly's prior positions in the Kazakh government. Wales also said that he would have "refused to give that award" had he known of Kenzhekhanuly's future deputy governorship.	
2012	—N/a	"Demmy"	Yoruba Wikipedia	"Demmy" created a bot to translate 15,000 short English articles into Yoruba, a language spoken in Nigeria.	
2013	A man with short hair in a black coat wearing glasses.	Rémi Mathis	French Wikipedia	Mathis, a chairman of Wikimédia France and a French Wikipedia administrator, received the honor for his role in the controversy surrounding the French article about the Pierre-sur-Haute military radio station.	
2014	A man wearing an orange with blue stripes jersey.	Ihor Kostenko	Ukrainian Wikipedia	Kostenko, a Euromaidan activist, was an editor on the Ukrainian Wikipedia and actively promoted it on social networking sites. He was killed during a protest on February 20, 2014, and received the award posthumously.	
2015	—N/a	Undisclosed	Wikimedia Commons	Wales named an anonymous Venezuelan editor in pectore. He said that he wished to reveal their identity in the future without endangering them.	
2016	A woman wearing an aquamarine top and smiling.	Emily Temple-Wood	English Wikipedia	The first joint recipients for their efforts to combat harassment on Wikipedia and increase its coverage of women. Temple-Wood had created nearly 400 articles and improved hundreds more, with many about women scientists and women's health. Stephenson-Goodknight had improved more than 3,000 articles, co-created a space to welcome new contributors to the site, and co-founded women's outreach projects, including the "WikiWomen's User Group", "WikiProject Women", and the "Women in Red" campaign.	
2016	A woman wearing a black top and earring and smiling.	Rosie Stephenson-Goodknight	English Wikipedia	The first joint recipients for their efforts to combat harassment on Wikipedia and increase its coverage of women. Temple-Wood had created nearly 400 articles and improved hundreds more, with many about women scientists and women's health. Stephenson-Goodknight had improved more than 3,000 articles, co-created a space to welcome new contributors to the site, and co-founded women's outreach projects, including the "WikiWomen's User Group", "WikiProject Women", and the "Women in Red" campaign.	
2017	A black man with short hair smiling.	Felix Nartey	English Wikipedia	Nartey received the award for his addition of content about his home country, Ghana, and his leadership of several initiatives to promote participation on Wikipedia. In his dedication, Wales mentioned that Nartey played a leading role in the organization of the 2nd Wiki Indaba conference 2017 in Accra, and had been critical in building up local communities in Africa.	
2018	A man wearing a blue shirt and smiling.	Farhad Fatkullin	Tatar Wikipedia	Fatkullin joined the Wikimedia movement in 2009. He describes himself as being "in love with Tatar Wikipedia". From 2015, Fatkullin has been contributing to Wikipedia on languages of Russia, including Tatar.	
2019	A woman with black and little orange medium hair in a dark blue and white top and smiling in front of a camera.	Emna Mizouni	Arabic Wikipedia	In 2013, Mizouni with other people founded Carthagina. She began contributing to Wikimedia projects in 2013 with that year's Wiki Loves Monuments. She has helped to organize several major Wikimedia conferences, including the inaugural WikiArabia conference, and co-chaired Wikimania 2018's program committee. In 2016, she joined the Affiliations Committee and in 2018, she became vice-chairperson of it.	
2020		Sandister Tei	English Wikipedia	Tei contributed actively to Wikipedia articles about the COVID-19 pandemic's impact in Ghana.	
2021		Alaa Najjar	Arabic Wikipedia	Najjar was honored at the Wikimania 2021 conference, which was held virtually, for his work on Arabic Wikipedia and on medical projects, especially the COVID-19 project.	
2022		Olga Paredes	Spanish Wikipedia	Paredes was honored at the virtual Wikimania 2022 conference for her leadership in communities including Wikimujeres and Wikimedistas de Bolivia, and for encouraging others, especially women, to grow the Wikimedia movement.	
2023		Taufik Rosman	Wikidata, Malay Wiktionary	Taufik was honored at the 2023 Wikimania conference in Singapore for his massive contributions to the Malay Wiktionary and for the help given in fostering a positive community of Malaysian Wikimedia editors.	
2024	A woman with medium-length hair wearing a black shirt and smiling.	Hannah Clover	English Wikipedia	Clover, a Canadian also known as Clovermoss, collected the stories of over 200 editors through her "editor reflections" project. She also advocated for new editors and those editing on smartphones. She was the youngest recipient of the award, at age 21.	
2025		Robert Sim	English Wikipedia	Sim focuses on improving Singapore-related content on Wikipedia and helped launch the Wikimedians of Singapore user group in 2023. That year, he also helped coordinate Wikimania 2023 in Singapore.	
2026		Jules Xénard	French Wikipedia	Jules Xénard, also known as Jules*, for his contributions on sensitive topics such as global warming and his actions against promotional content and disinformation.	

=== Honorable mentions ===
List of Wikimedian of the Year honorable mentions
Year	Image	Recipient	Principal project	Rationale	Ref.
2015	A woman with short hair wearing a black top with white drawings.	Susanna Mkrtchyan	Armenian Wikipedia	Mkrtchyan is a member of the board of directors from Wikimedia Armenia. She was awarded for her off-wiki activities including "One Armenian – One Article", an editing campaign and youth camp project to aid new editors of Armenia.	
2015	An Asian man with blue shirt with a small beard smiling	Satdeep Gill	Punjabi Wikipedia (Eastern)	Gill is an Indian contributor on the Punjabi Wikipedia. He was awarded for encouraging people at his university to edit the Punjabi Wikipedia, making it the fastest-growing Indic-language Wikipedia that year.	
2016	A man with a sweater looking in front of camera.	Mardetanha	Persian Wikipedia	Mardetanha created the Persian-language version of the "Wikipedia Library", which helps editors to find sources for articles. Three publishers have donated the research access to their works to editors.	
2016	A woman wearing necklace with glasses and smiling.	Vassia Atanassova	Bulgarian Wikipedia	Atanassova established the "#100wikidays" contest, which challenges editors to create one Wikipedia article per day for one hundred days. Over 120 contributors joined the contest and a third of the editors have completed it.	
2017	—N/a	Diego Gómez	—N/a	Colombian student who was prosecuted for copyright violation after having shared an academic paper online. He was later acquitted.	
2018	An Asian man wearing glasses looking in front of camera.	Nahid Sultan	Bangla Wikipedia	Sultan is an active member of Wikimedia Bangladesh.	
2018	A woman wearing a white sweatshirt, glasses and smiling.	Jess Wade	English Wikipedia	Wade is a physicist who began a year-long effort to create Wikipedia articles about scientists and engineers which "better represent women and people of colour". As of February 2020, she had written over 900 new articles.	
2021		Netha Hussain	English Wikipedia, Malayalam Wikipedia	Hussain is a medical practitioner originally from India. She has provided invaluable contributions to medical content on Wikimedia projects, focusing much of her effort during 2020–21 on the coverage of COVID-19. She also started the Vaccine Safety Project to address misinformation surrounding COVID-19 vaccines.	
2021		Carmen Alcázar	Spanish Wikipedia	Alcázar was recognized for her work to reduce the gender gap on Spanish Wikipedia.	
2022		Anna Torres	Spanish Wikipedia	Torres is the executive director of Wikimedia Argentina, but her recognition in the Honorable Mentions category is for her efforts to create an international support network to grow and build capacity for communities across Latin America, as well as her contributions to movement processes, such as the 2030 Wikimedia Movement Strategy.	
2023		Anton Protsiuk	Ukrainian Wikipedia	Protsiuk is the Programmes Coordinator at Wikimedia Ukraine.	
2024		Gu Eun-ae	Korean Wikipedia	Gu is the director of Wikimedia Korea, which she helped found.	
2025		Nitesh Gill	Punjabi Wikipedia (Eastern)	Nitesh began editing in 2014 and has been a key contributor to Punjabi Wikipedia ever since. She took on the #100wikidays challenge in 2017, kept going past 100, and reached 500 days. Her work has been central to closing the gender gap—Punjabi Wikipedia now has more articles about women than any other gender, thanks in large part to her.	
2025		Ammarpad	Hausa Wikipedia	He first joined the Wikimedia community in 2015 via the English Wikipedia, where he wrote articles (especially biographies) about Nigeria. As he gained experience, he focused on improving the quality of Nigerian-related content across a range of topics. He is the co-founder and led the Wikimedia Hausa. He was a Project Manager for the Wikipedia Pages Wanting Photos campaign in 2022 and 2023. Beyond editing, Ammarpad has worked for about five years on supporting the software that powers all Wikimedia projects: MediaWiki. He has made more than 900 software changes and reviewed hundreds of others.	
2026		Hijiri Umemoto	Japanese Wikipedia		
2026		Mari Avetisyan	Armenian Wikipedia		

=== Newcomer of the Year ===
The Newcomer of the Year award was first presented in 2021.

List of Newcomer of the Year award recipients
Year	Image	Recipient	Principal project	Rationale	Ref.
2021		Carma Citrawati	WikiPustaka	First starting to edit the Balinese version of Wikipedia in 2019, Citrawati was instrumental in the development of a Balinese version of Wikisource called WikiPustaka through her valiant efforts to lead a team responsible for digitizing and translating ancient Balinese writings which were originally written on palm leaves.	
2022		Nkem Osuigwe		With an account that started in 2019, Dr. Nkem Osuigwe helped to start a partnership with the African Library and Information Associations & Institutions in 2020, working with an existing professional network to generate over 27,000 edits and counting.	
2023		Eugene Ormandy	Japanese Wikipedia	Ormandy created two Wikimedia user groups: Student Wikipedian Community in Waseda University Tokyo and the Toumon Wikipedian Club Japan. He is the first award recipient from Japan.	
2024		Wayuu community (Leonardi Fernández)	Wayuu Wikipedia	The Wayuu are an indigenous group of the Guajira Peninsula in Colombia and Venezuela. Fernández helped establish the Wikimedistas Wayúu (Wayuu Wikimedians) user group and the Wayuu-language Wikipedia in 2023.	
2025		Konan N’Da N’Dri (User:Dadrik)	French Wikipedia	An active member of Wikimedia Côte d’Ivoire, Dadrik contributes to French Wikipedia as a patroller and shares his passion for astrophysics as a trainer.	

=== Wikimedia Laureate (formerly 20th Year Honouree) ===
The 20th Year Honouree award was first presented in 2021. In 2022, the award was renamed Wikimedia Laureate.

List of award recipients
Year	Image	Recipient	Principal project	Rationale	Ref.
2021		Lodewijk Gelauff	Wiki Loves Monuments	Gelauff is a prolific contributor, a mentor to many Wikimedians, and a volunteer for many community groups and efforts. He is one of the initiators of Wiki Loves Monuments, the annual Wikipedia photo contest around cultural heritage, and has led this project for a decade.	
2022		Andrew Lih		Lih is an internationally renowned Wikipedia expert, author, professor, GLAMs activist, and long-time Wikimedia contributor. His work has inspired individuals and groups in the Wikimedia movement, especially in North America and the ESEAP region.	
2022		Deror Lin	Hebrew Wikipedia, Wikimania	Lin was a prolific contributor going back to the founding of Wikipedia. He wrote over 2 percent of the entire Hebrew Wikipedia. He participated in many 100wikidays challenges, particularly for Hebrew Wikipedia, and contributed thousands of images. He was also a key organizer of multiple Wikimanias.	
2023		Siobhan Leachman	WikiProject New Zealand	Leachman has improved content about New Zealand biodiversity and notable women on Wikipedia, Wikidata, and Wikimedia Commons.	
2024		Martin (DerHexer)		DerHexer is the longest-serving Wikimedia steward, becoming one in 2007; he is also an administrator of English Wikipedia, Meta-Wiki, and Wikimedia Commons.	
2025		Anne Clin (User:Risker)	English Wikipedia	Risker is a longtime English Wikipedia administrator and a two-time Arbitration Committee member who has held numerous key global roles within the Wikimedia movement.	
2026		Britta Gustafson (User:Dreamyshade)	English Wikipedia	Britta Gustafson, also known as Dreamyshade, started editing in 2001 and has been contributing for 25 years.	
2026	—	Barkeep49	English Wikipedia	Barkeep49 is a long-time editor in the English Wikipedia who has improved the safety of the Wikimedia movement.	

=== Tech Contributor of the Year (formerly Tech Innovator) ===
The Tech Innovator award was first presented in 2021. The honor was renamed Tech Contributor of the Year in 2022.

List of award recipients
Year	Image	Recipient	Principal project	Rationale	Ref.
2021	User:Jayprakash12345 during Wikimania 2019.	Jay Prakash	Software development and support	Prakash has contributed to various technical projects within Wikipedia, from providing tech support via Indic-TechCom to developing IndicOCR, a tool extending the capabilities of GoogleOCR for several Indic languages. Jimmy Wales says, "Jay’s significant contributions have helped improve MediaWiki, the foundational software that underpins all of the projects. In addition to his technical achievements, he is a strong advocate for the technical community and epitomizes the generosity and collaborative nature of our movement."	
2022		Taavi Väänänen	Wikimedia Cloud Services, CentralAuth MediaWiki extension	Väänänen has been a critical volunteer contributor to Wikimedia Cloud Services, including Toolforge and Cloud VPS, key pieces of infrastructure that let community members host their Wikimedia-related bots, tools, and other software projects. He also helps maintain the CentralAuth MediaWiki extension, which allows users to use a single user account on all public Wikimedia sites.	
2023	—N/a	Alexander Vorwerk (User:Zabe)	Wikimedia infrastructure	Zabe is recognized for "helping with deployments, bug fixes, and incidents in general, and, in particular, ... for maintaining Checkuser and CentralAuth codes, for supporting the comment database refactor migration revision, and for the technical work behind creating new wikis."	
2024	—N/a	Siddharth VP	MediaWiki and draft submission interface	Siddharth has contributed to Twinkle, an editor tool, and MediaWiki, the database software which Wikipedia relies on. In addition, he has developed his own user scripts and bots. He is most proud of his work on the draft submission interface.	
2025		Egbe Eugene (User:Eugene233)	Wikimedia tool development	Eugene helped build Wikimedia movement technical capacity across Africa and played a key role in training, tool development, and the creation of the ISA Tool.	

=== Media Contributor of the Year (formerly Rich Media) ===
The Rich Media award was first presented in 2021. The honor was renamed Media Contributor of the Year in 2022.

List of Rich Media award recipients
Year	Image	Recipient	Principal project	Rationale	Ref.
2021		Ananya Mondal	Wikimedia Commons	Mondal launched the Wiki Loves Butterfly project in 2016.	
2022		Annie Rauwerda	Depths of Wikipedia	Rauwerda uses creative means on social media to spread the word about Wikimedia projects and communities that power them. She started the Depths of Wikipedia account that has now more than 1.5 million followers across Instagram, Twitter, and TikTok.	
2023		Pax Ahimsa Gethen	English Wikipedia, Wikimedia Commons	Gethen uploads photographs to Wikimedia Commons, focused on LGBTQ culture, and is an active participant at English Wikipedia's WikiProject LGBTQ+ studies.	
2024		Yılmaz Caner Özyayıkçı	Turkish Wikipedia	Özyayıkçı helps design graphics for several Wikimedia conferences. He is also a co-founder of Wikimedia Japan-Türkiye Friendship.	
2025		Vera de Kok	Wikimedia Commons, Wikidata	De Kok is a photographer and programmer who has uploaded over 85,000 files to Wikimedia Commons. Of these 7,500 are her original creations, which appeared on 134 different language editions of Wikipedia.	

=== Wikimedia Affiliate Spotlight ===
The Wikimedia Affiliate Spotlight was first presented in 2022. Art+Feminism and Wikimedia UK were recognized by the Wikimedia Affiliation Committee (AffCom) in the Partnerships and Governance categories, respectively.

=== Functionary of the Year ===
The Functionary of the Year award was first presented in 2024, to recognize Wikimedians who work behind the scenes to "ensure the safety, smooth operation, and sustainability of Wikimedia projects".

List of Functionary of the Year award recipients
Year	Image	Recipient	Principal project	Rationale	Ref.
2024		Vira Motorko	Ukrainian Wikipedia	Motorko is an administrator of the Ukrainian Wikipedia, where she helps with minor tasks, such as translating the interface and formatting pages.	
2025		Mateusz Kopeć	Polish Wikipedia	Updates the Polish Wikipedia’s "Did You Know" (Czy wiesz) column every day and serves as a Wikimedia steward.	

=== Community Connector of the Year ===
The Community Connector of the Year award was first presented in 2026, to recognize a Wikimedian "who brings people together and makes our communities stronger".

List of Community Connector of the Year award recipients
Year	Image	Recipient	Principal project	Rationale	Ref.
2026		Chlod Alejandro	English Wikipedia		

== Other awards ==
Various Wikimedia affiliate organisations give national "Wikimedian of the Year" awards. For example, Wikimedia UK has given a series of "UK Wikimedian of the Year" awards to people and organisations since 2012.

There are also more specialized recognitions. For example, in Estonia there are the Wikipedia Photographer of the Year and Friend of Wikipedia awards that go to the best photographer and someone who has supported the Wikimedia movement the most in any given year, respectively.

== See also ==
- List of volunteering awards
- List of Wikipedia people
