= Vira Motorko =

Ukrainian Internet activist (born 1991)

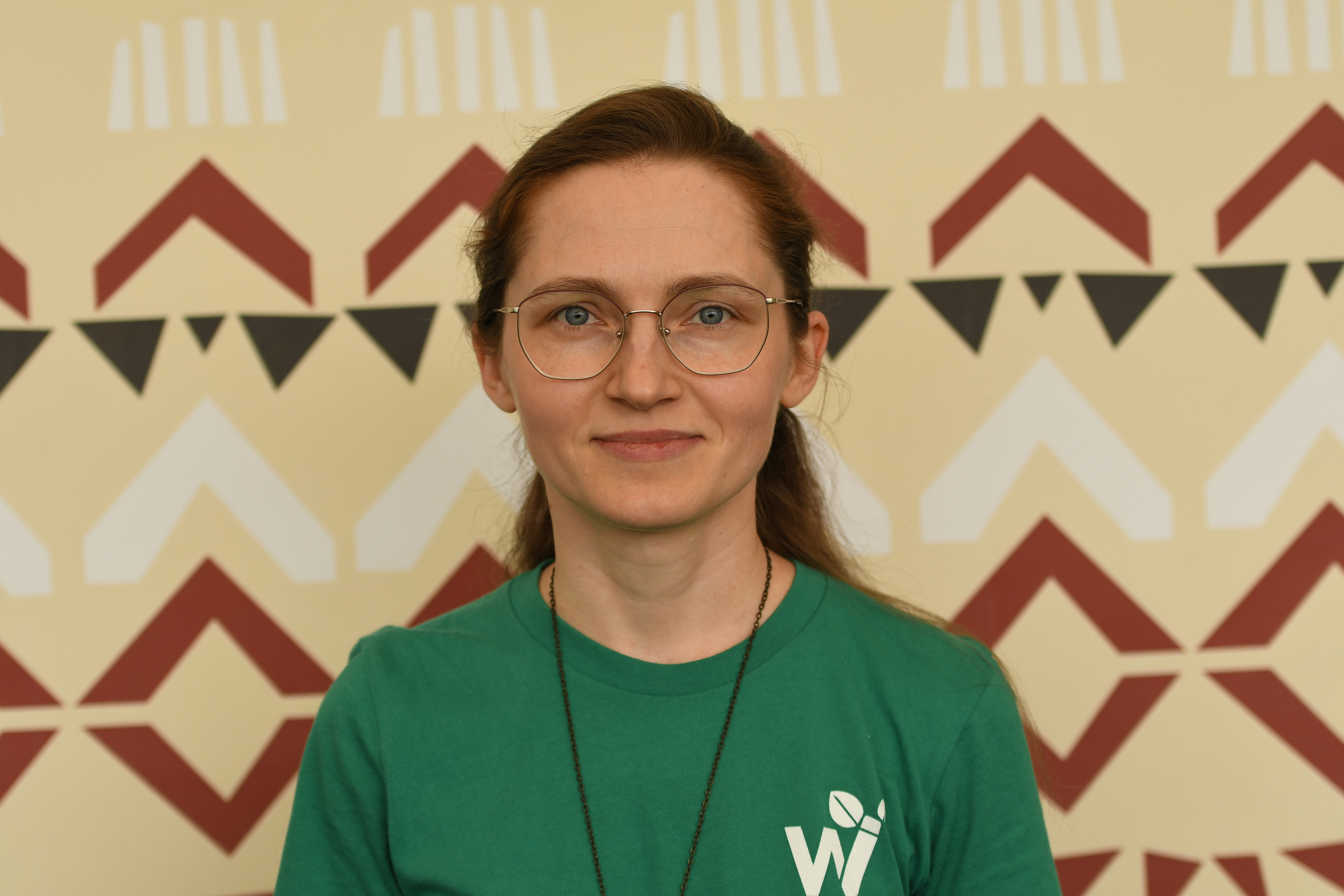
- Motorko at Wikimania 2025 in Nairobi
- Born: 1991 (age 34–35)
- Occupations: Internet activist; Wikimedian
- Awards: Wikimedian of the Year (2024)

Vira Motorko (born 1991) is a Ukrainian Internet activist and 2024 recipient of Wikimedian Functionary of the Year.

== Biography and volunteer work ==
She worked as a geography teacher at the Rivne Humanitarian Gymnasium of the Rivne City Council.

She first registered on Wikipedia in 2009, during her first year of university. Since 2012, she has been a member of the NGO Wikimedia Ukraine, conducted training for newcomers, helped with the competition Wiki Loves Monuments, and translated the Wikipedia interface.

From 2014 to 2019, Motorko worked with Wikimedia Ukraine as a PR and project manager. Since 2019, she has focused on volunteer contributions to wikiprojects. In 2023, she received administrator rights on Wikipedia. Besides developing the project, she hosts webinars and training sessions to help newcomers become skilled Wikipedia contributors.

== Awards ==
- Wikimedian of the Year in the category Functionary of the Year (2024, for continuous work on small tasks that often go unnoticed but are always needed: translating technical messages, documenting templates, improving interface messages or formatting).
- Winner in the Talents for Ukraine grant program launched by the Kyiv School of Economics Foundation (2024)

== See also ==
- List of Wikipedia people
