= Susanna Mkrtchyan =

Armenian Wikimedian (born 1949)

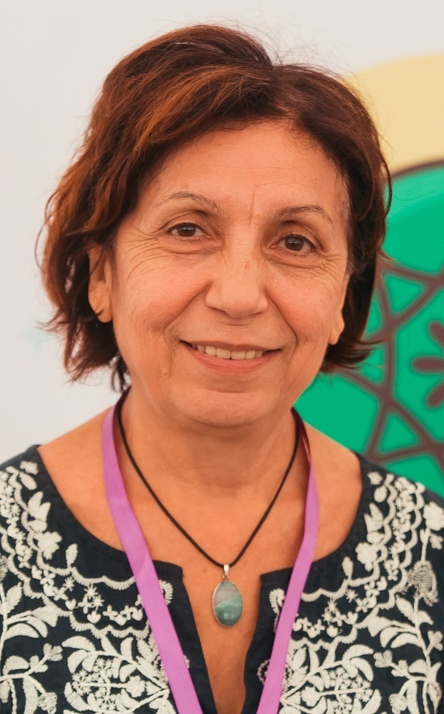
- Mkrtchyan in 2019
- Born: 26 August 1949 (age 76); Yerevan, Armenian SSR, Soviet Union
- Occupations: Professor; Wikipedian
- Awards: Wikimedian of the Year – Honorable mention (2015)

Susanna Mkrtchyan (Armenian: Սուսաննա Մկրտչյան, pronounced [susɑnˈnɑ məkəɾtˈtʃʰjɑn]; born 26 August 1949) is an Armenian professor of database and system research, PhD of technical sciences, Wikimedian. She founded and leads the Wikimedia Armenia chapter (2013–2020), which organizes outreach and workshops to improve the Armenian Wikipedia, including an annual conference. She conceived and turned into reality the vision of wikicamp and wikiclub projects, which were recognized as the coolest projects accordingly, in 2014 and 2016. During Wikimania 2015, she received an honourable mention in the context of the annual award Wikimedian of the Year attributed by Wikipedia co-founder Jimmy Wales. In 2018, Susanna Mkrtchyan was elected Vice President of the World Wikipedia and User Education Group and served until 2024.

== Life and work ==
Susanna Mkrtchyan was born in Yerevan, Armenian SSR, Soviet Union. She studied at Avetik Isahakyan School in Yerevan, and later attended the Manuk Abeghyan School with a focus on mathematics, graduating with honors.

In 1966–1971, she studied at the cybernetics department of the Mechanics-Mathematics Faculty of Yerevan State University. After graduating from the university, in 1971, she worked at the Mergelyan Institute. In 1977, she moved to the Computing Center of the State Planning Committee of the ArmSSR, from where she was dispatched to the Institute for Systems Analysis of the Russian Academy of Sciences in 1984–1986, where she was engaged in the development of the "INES" database management system. During that time, she developed the Database-User Interface under the leadership of Vladimir Arlazarov, for which she received PhD in technical sciences, in 1986. 1986–1996 Susanna returned to the Computer Center of the State Planning Committee of ArmSSR. Since 2010, she has worked as a senior researcher at the Institute for Informatics and Automation Problems.

== Wiki volunteer ==
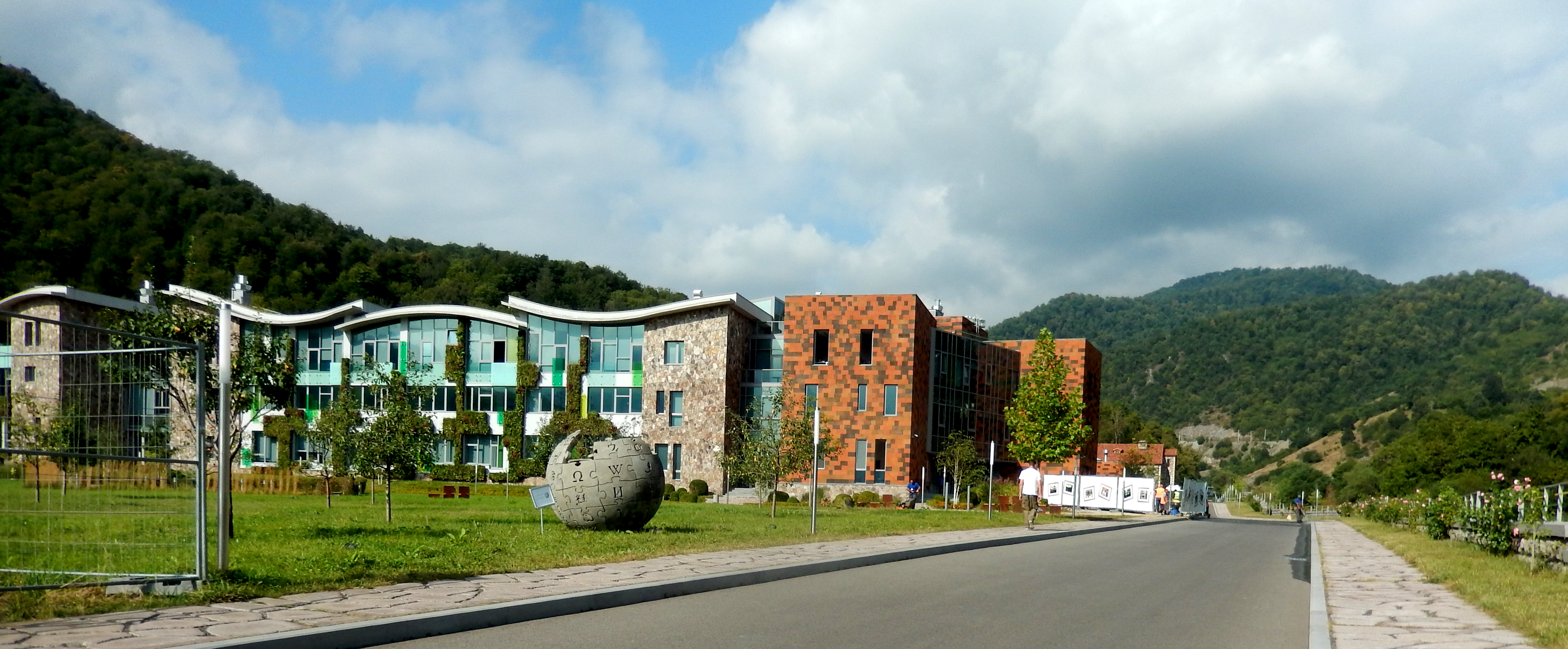
CEE Meeting in Dilijan, Wikipedia monument at UWC Dilijan

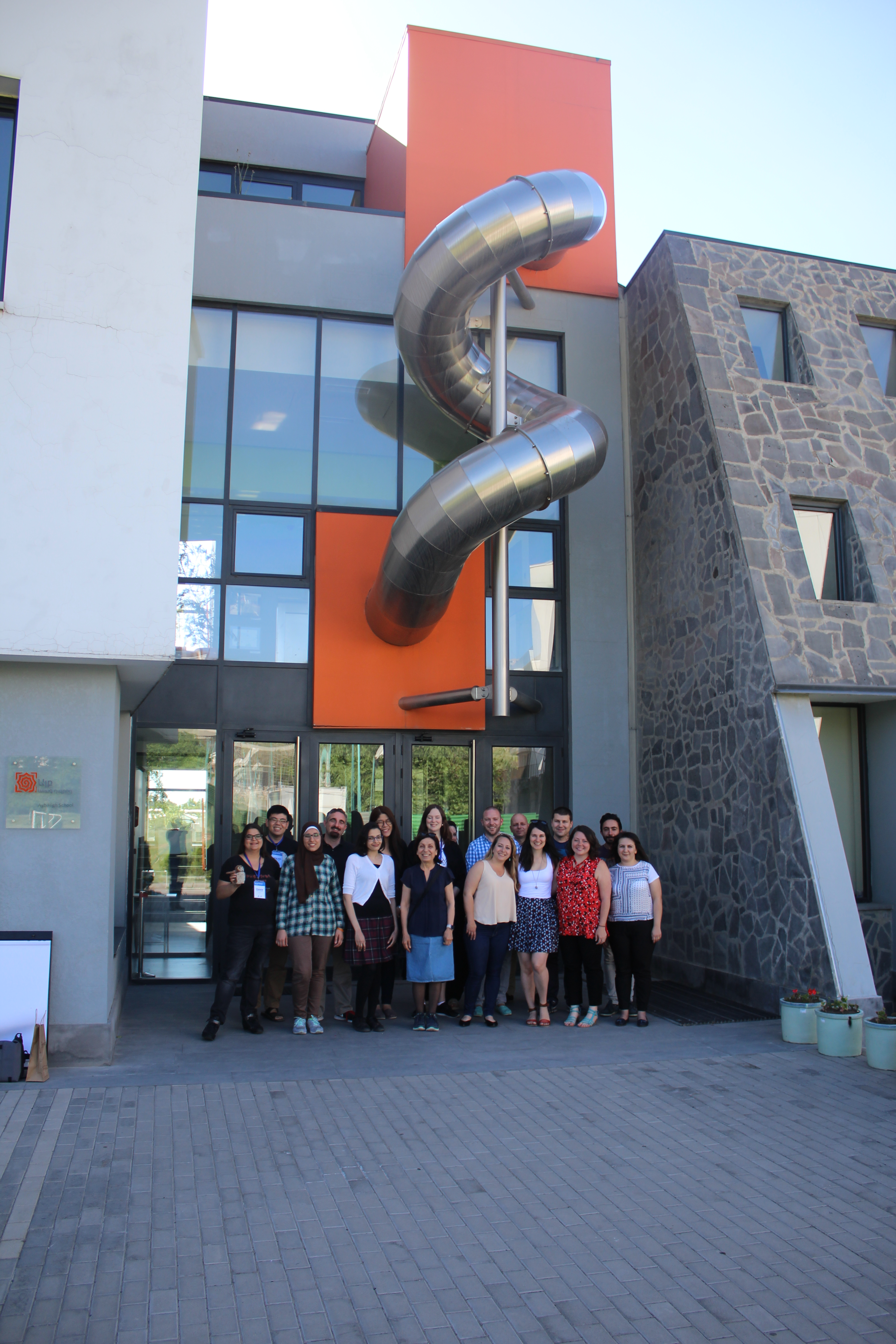
Wikipedia Education Collaborative Meeting at Ayb School in Yerevan, Armenia, June 2–4

Susanna Mkrtchyan started editing Wikipedia in 2010. Being in the field of science, she noticed that Wikipedia can create an environment of cooperation between scientists both within Armenia and between Armenia and abroad. In 2011, she attended the Wikipedia Foundation's annual Wikimania conference held in Haifa (Israel) and discussed about having an Armenian branch with the Foundation's representatives. Wikimedia Armenia NGO was founded on May 14, 2013.

Susanna is the author of several new educational ideas in the field of Wikipedia, which have been highly appreciated by Wiki community and emulated worldwide.

Due to the effectiveness of the measures aimed at dissemination the Wikimedia movement in Armenia in August 2016, the Wikimedia Central and Eastern European fifth annual Meeting was organized in Armenia at the International School of Dilijan.
