= Felix Nartey =

Ghanaian social entrepreneur and 2017 Wikipedian of the Year

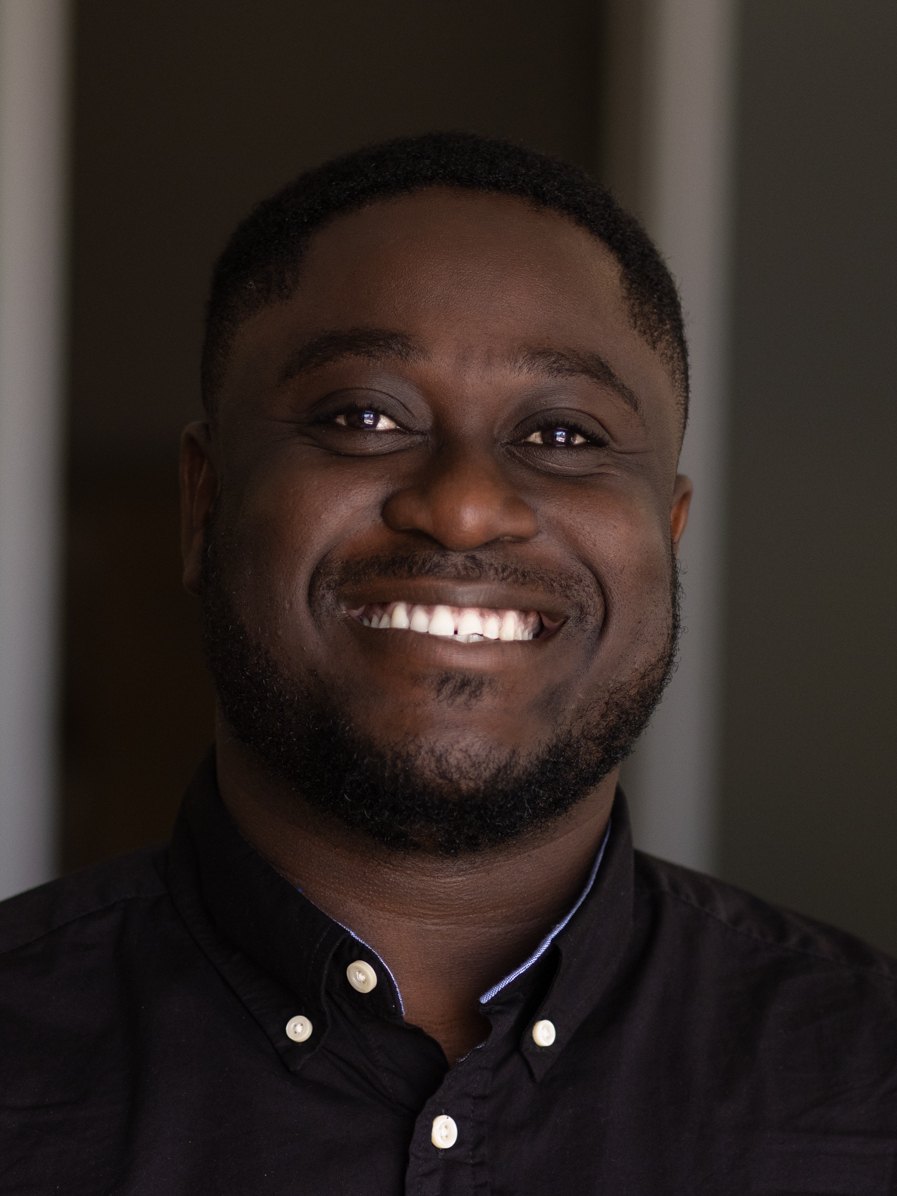
- Nartey in 2023
- Born: Tema, Ghana
- Education: Central University College (BSc); Hochschule Anhalt (MBA); Pope John Senior High School and Minor Seminary
- Occupations: Social entrepreneur; Wikipedia editor; Partnerships Manager
- Awards: Wikimedian of the Year (2017)
- Nartey's voice Recorded October 2017

Felix Nartey (/ˈnɑːrteɪ/) is a Ghanaian social entrepreneur and advocate. He was named the Wikimedian of the Year in 2017 by Wikipedia co-founder Jimmy Wales at Wikimania. He is co-founder of Open Foundation West Africa and Creative Commons Ghana, where he is also the chapter lead.

== Early life ==
Nartey was born in Tema, Ghana. He graduated from Pope John Secondary School in 2008, Central University with a bachelor's degree in Banking and Finance in 2013, and completed his Master of Business Administration from the Anhalt University of Applied Sciences. While studying at Central University, he was appointed a Google Student Ambassador, a position that surged his interest in technology.

== Career ==
Nartey worked as a banker after his first degree, and was an avid volunteer in other capacities. He served as the community manager for Wikimedia Ghana. He later co-founded Open Foundation West Africa, a non-profit organisation whose goal is to encourage the creation of content under open licenses.

As of August 2017, Nartey worked as a consultant in the capacity of a Global Coordinator for the Wikipedia Library at the Wikimedia Foundation. Nartey will go on to work in different capacities at the Wikimedia Foundation, where he currently occupies the position of a Senior Partnerships Manager, Sub-Saharan Africa.

He has also served in different capacities on boards and as an advisor. He served for more than five years as a board chair for Open Foundation West Africa, currently serves as an advisory board member for Kiwix and an advisory committee member for Open Access Week.

== Contributions in the Open Movement ==
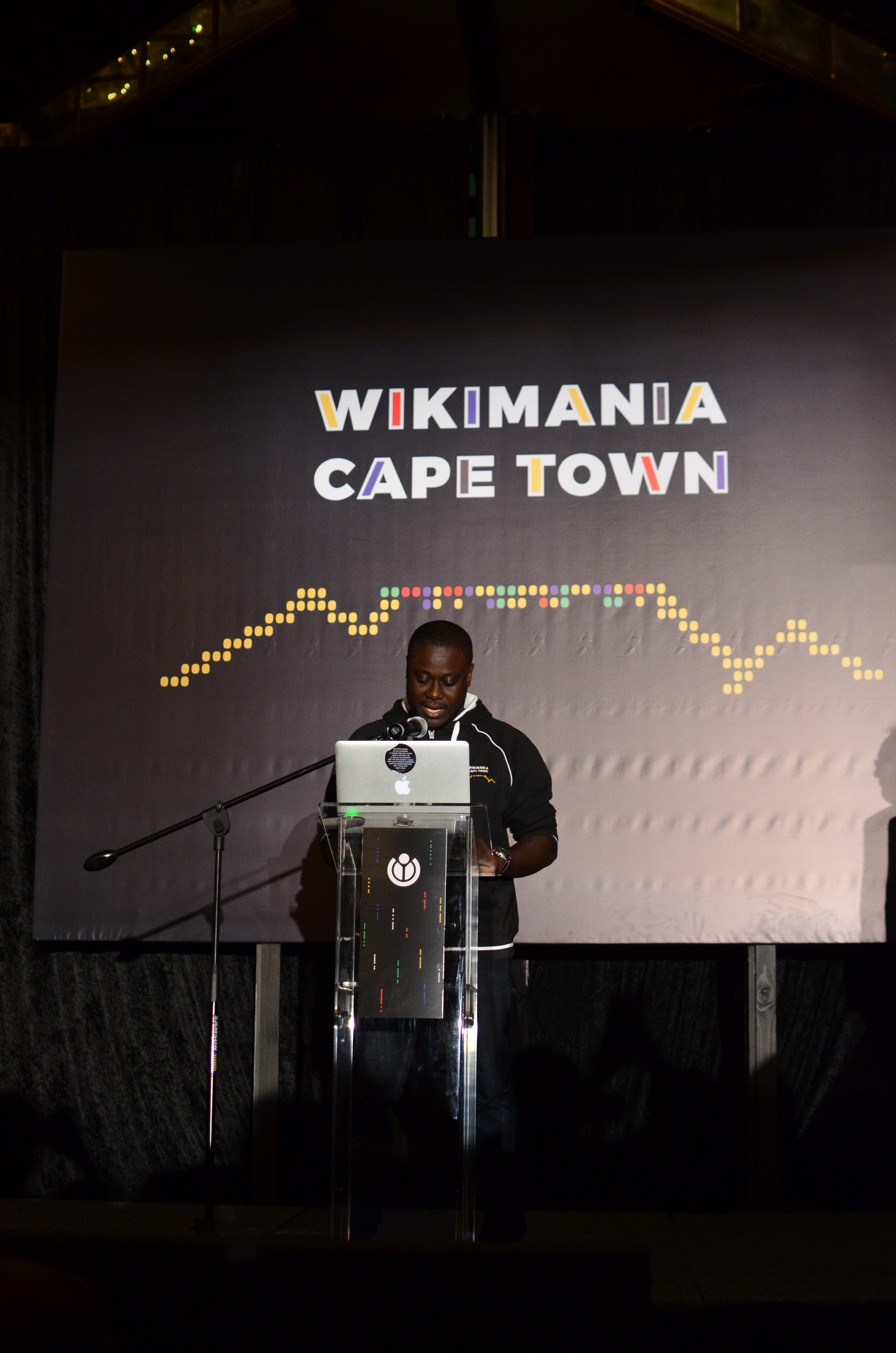
Nartey delivers a closing speech at Wikimania 2018.

Nartey joined the Wikimedia movement in 2012. He adds content about his home country, Ghana, and leads several initiatives to promote the importance of editing Wikipedia, including GLAM activities, the Wikipedia Education Program, activities targeted at bridging the gender gap, and the Wikipedia Library.

He was a member of the Drafting Committee for the Wikimedia Movement Strategy, a member of the Advisory Group for the transition of the Creative Commons Global Network Strategy and member of the interim Global Network Council for Creative Commons. He was also a member of the core team of the Firefox Africa Group.

In his Wikipedian of the Year dedication, Wales mentioned that Nartey played a leading role in the organisation of the second Wiki Indaba conference 2017 in Accra, and has been critical in building up the local communities in Africa.

== See also ==
- List of Wikipedia people
- Heather Ford
