= Netha Hussain =

Indian physician and Wikipedian (born 1990)

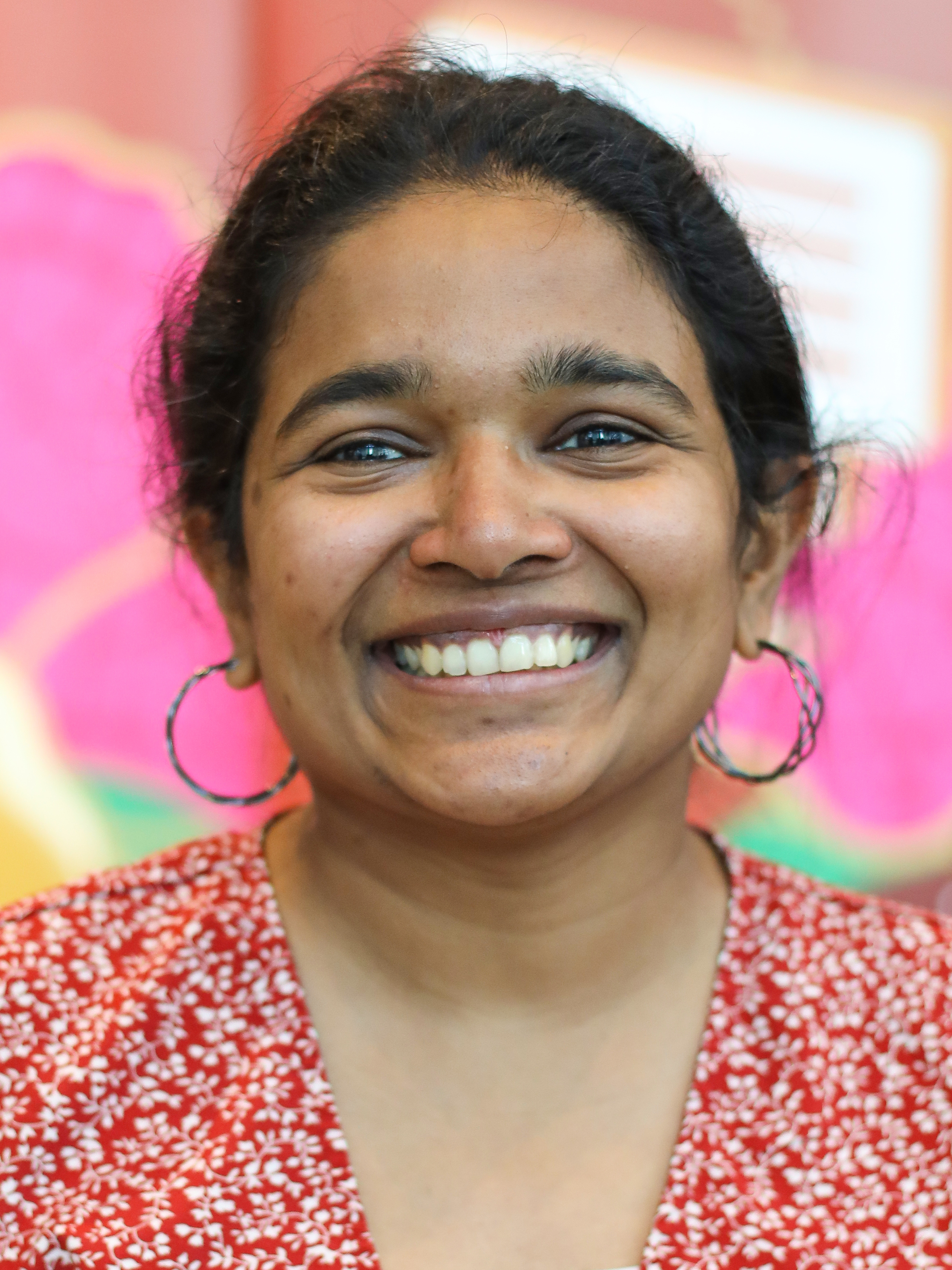
- Hussain during Wikimania 2023
- Born: 11 June 1990 (age 36); Kunnamangalam, Kerala, India
- Occupations: Physician; researcher; Wikipedian
- Awards: Women in Open Source Award (2020); Wikimedian of the Year – Honourable Mention (2021)
- Website: nethahussain.com

Netha Hussain (Malayalam pronunciation: [nɐdɐ husɐin]; born 11 June 1990) is an Indian physician and Wikipedian known for her efforts to tackle the spread of misinformation in Wikipedia about the origin of the coronavirus.

== Life and career ==
Hussain was born on 11 June 1990 in Kunnamangalam in the state of Kerala.

Hussain embarked in her Wikipedia career in 2010 when she was still at first-year medical student at the Calicut Medical College in Kozhikode, India. She pursued her higher studies in 2016 by joining the University of Gothenburg in Sweden. She also worked as a blogger at Huffington Post until 2018. In 2020, she obtained her PhD in Clinical Neuroscience from the University of Gothenburg.

In mid-2020, she began focusing on creating and curating Wikipedia articles related to the COVID-19 pandemic in English, Malayalam and Swedish language editions. She has written nearly 30 articles on Wikipedia relating to COVID-19 including List of unproven methods against COVID-19 with the purpose of preventing the spread of misinformation about the pandemic in internet and social media platforms.

== Awards ==
In 2020, Hussain received the Women in Open Source Academic Award, recognising her contributions regarding disseminating and sharing medical knowledge and information in Wikipedia. She also received an honourable special mention from the United Nations through its official Twitter handle in 2020. In 2021, she received a Wikimedian of the Year Honourable Mention by Wikipedia co-founder Jimmy Wales during the virtual Wikimania conference.

== Publications ==
- "Guaranteeing the safety of vaccine information". The Jakarta Post. Archived from the original on 9 July 2021.
- Hussain, Netha (28 July 2020). "Strengthening vaccine safety information on Wikipedia". Medium. Archived from the original on 17 October 2022.

== See also ==
- List of Wikipedia people
