= Ihor Kostenko =

Ukrainian journalist and activist (1991–2014)

- Ігор Костенко
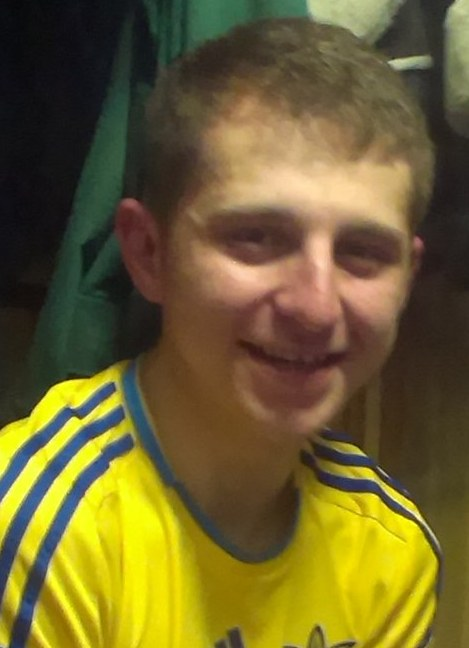
- Kostenko in 2013
- Born: Ihor Ihorovych Kostenko; 31 December 1991; Zubrets, Ternopil Oblast, Ukraine
- Died: 20 February 2014 (aged 22); October Palace, Kyiv, Ukraine
- Cause of death: Gunshot wounds
- Education: Lviv University
- Occupations: Journalist; student
- Awards: Wikipedian of the Year (2014); Hero of Ukraine (2014)

Ihor Ihorovych Kostenko (Ukrainian: Ігор Ігорович Костенко, IPA: [ˈiɦor ˈiɦorowɪtʃ kosˈtɛnko]; 31 December 1991 – 20 February 2014) was a Ukrainian journalist, student activist and Wikipedian killed during the Euromaidan events.

== Biography ==
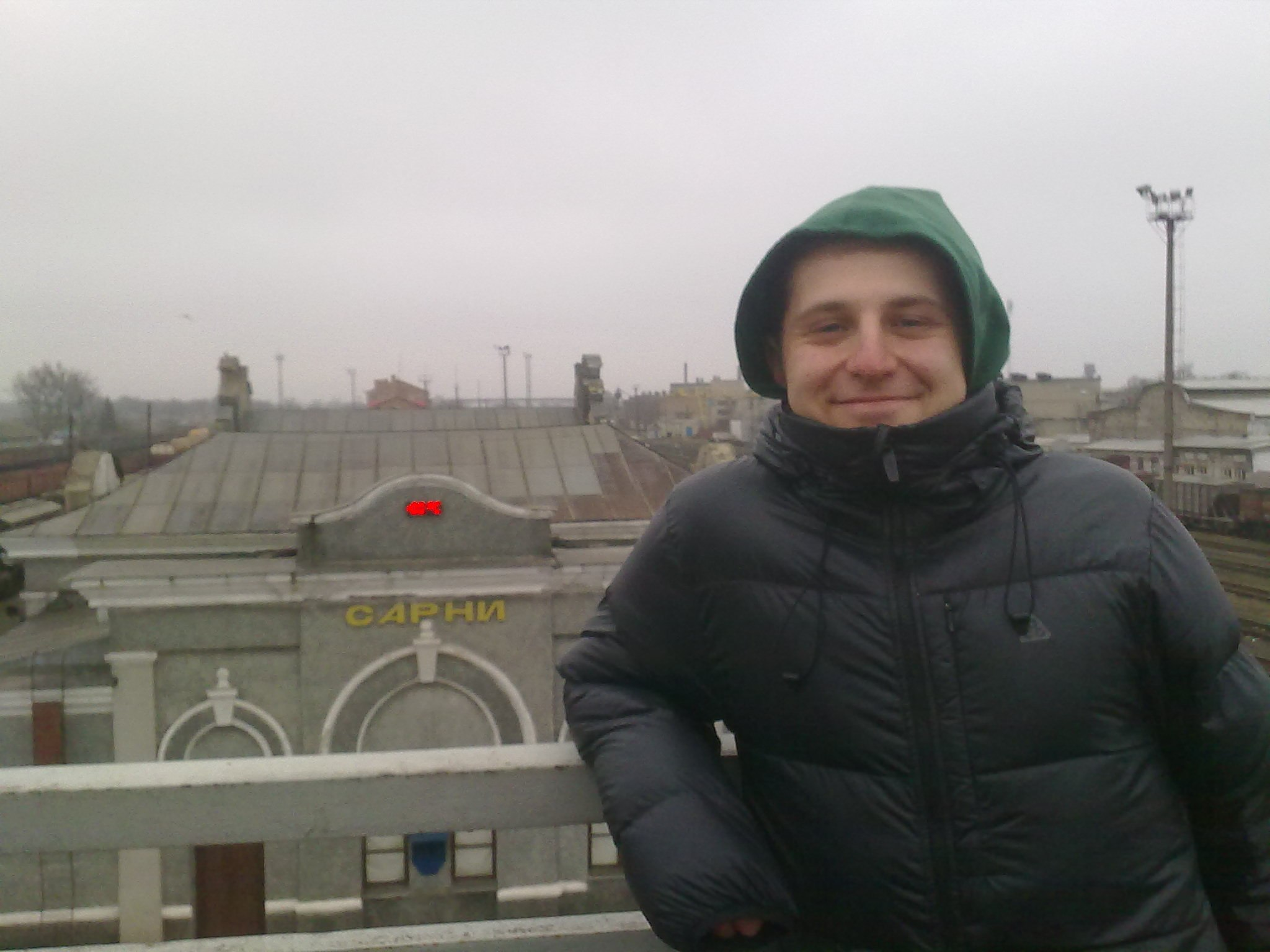
Kostenko in Sarny, Ukraine

Ihor Ihorovych Kostenko was born in Zubrets, Ternopil Oblast, Ukraine. He was raised by his grandparents, as his parents worked primarily in Saint Petersburg. As a child he attended Saint Josaphat Buchatskiy, a Ukrainian Catholic parochial school in Buchach. He had one sister, Inna.

Kostenko received his bachelor's degree in 2013 and was a first-year graduate student in geography at Ivan Franko National University of Lviv, in Western Ukraine. His thesis was the development of the tourism industry in Buchach. He also worked as a journalist for the online edition of the sports website Sportanalitika (Sport Analytics).

He was also a regular contributor to the Ukrainian Wikipedia under the nickname Ig2000, creating more than 280 articles on aviation, economics, football and other subjects. Kostenko's article on the Soviet destroyer Nezamozhnik was recognised with the "Good Article" rating.

== Death ==
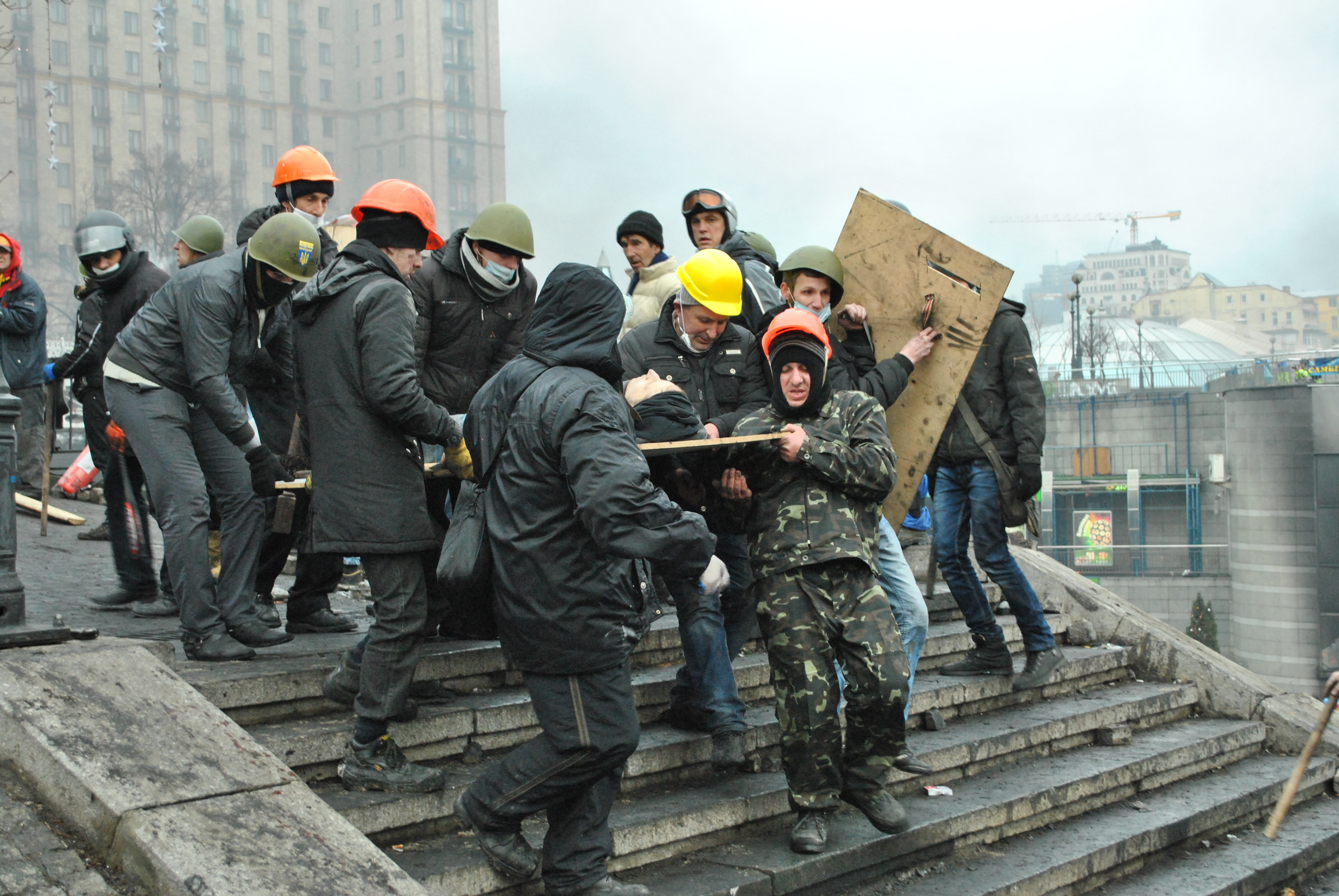
Ihor's body was being carried away from the October Palace

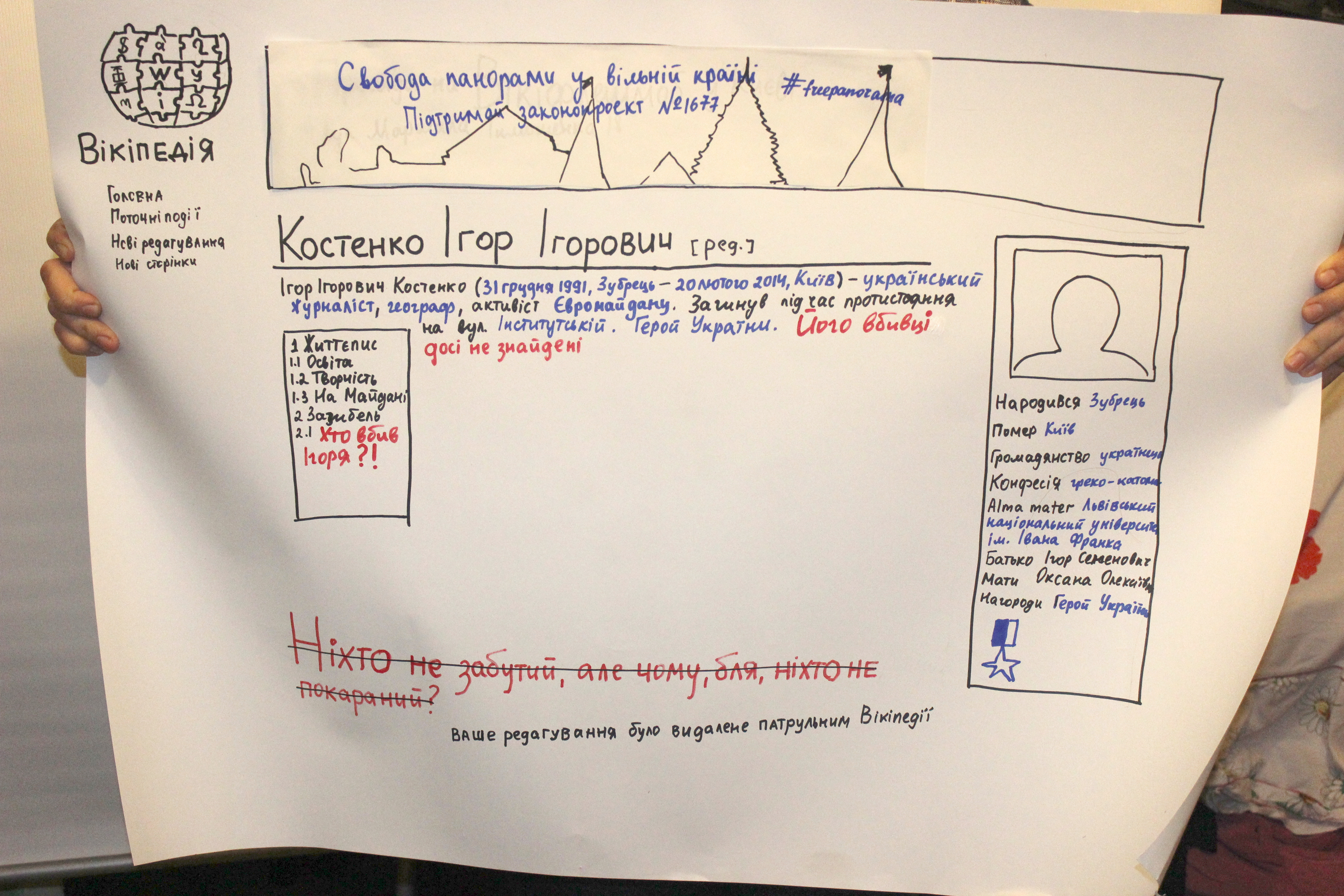
Sketch of Kostenko's Ukrainian Wikipedia article held up during a commemoration on 20 February 2015, the one-year anniversary of his death and of the deadliest day of Euromaidan. The red text at the bottom says, "Nobody's been forgotten, but why the fuck has nobody been punished?"

Kostenko went to Kyiv on 18 February 2014 to take part in the Euromaidan demonstrations, the pro-Western movement that broke out after Ukraine's government refused to ratify its earlier decision to join the European Union (EU). He joined other friends from Lviv in building barricades to protect the protesters. The confrontation between protesters and police worsened in the late hours of 19 February 2014, and snipers began shooting at demonstrators.

On 20 February 2014, Kostenko's body was found on the street, near the October Palace. He had gunshot wounds to the head and heart, and multiple fractures to his legs.

The day after his death, Kostenko's friend Yuriy Muryn recalled his last communications with Kostenko. "He just called me yesterday and I didn't hear it ring. I called him back today and he didn't answer. I just can't comprehend it," Muryn said. "And during the first riots on Hrushevskoho he sent me his girlfriend's phone number, saying: 'Tell her that I love her, if something happens.' I thought he was joking, but when riots broke out again, he asked: 'Do you remember about my request?'"

On 22 February 2014, a procession of hundreds of people followed his hearse taking Kostenko from Kyiv to Lviv for his funeral. More than 500 mourners held a candlelight vigil in Ternopil. Kostenko and six other victims from Euromaidan were mourned on 23 February at the Nativity of the Blessed Virgin Mary in Lviv.

== Legacy ==
On 21 November 2014, together with the other activists killed during Euromaidan, Kostenko was posthumously awarded the title "Hero of Ukraine," the highest national award a Ukrainian citizen can earn.

Kostenko was also named 2014 Wikipedian of the Year. Wikipedia founder Jimmy Wales announced the award during the 2014 Wikimania Conference in August in London. Wales presented the award to Kostenko's sister, Inna, in September in Kyiv.

The magazine of the Ministry of Education and Science of Ukraine posthumously named Kostenko "Student of the Year." The auditorium at Lviv University was renamed the "Ihor Kostenko Memorial Auditorium" in his honour. An additional plaque was installed at his high school, Saint Josaphat Buchatskiy.

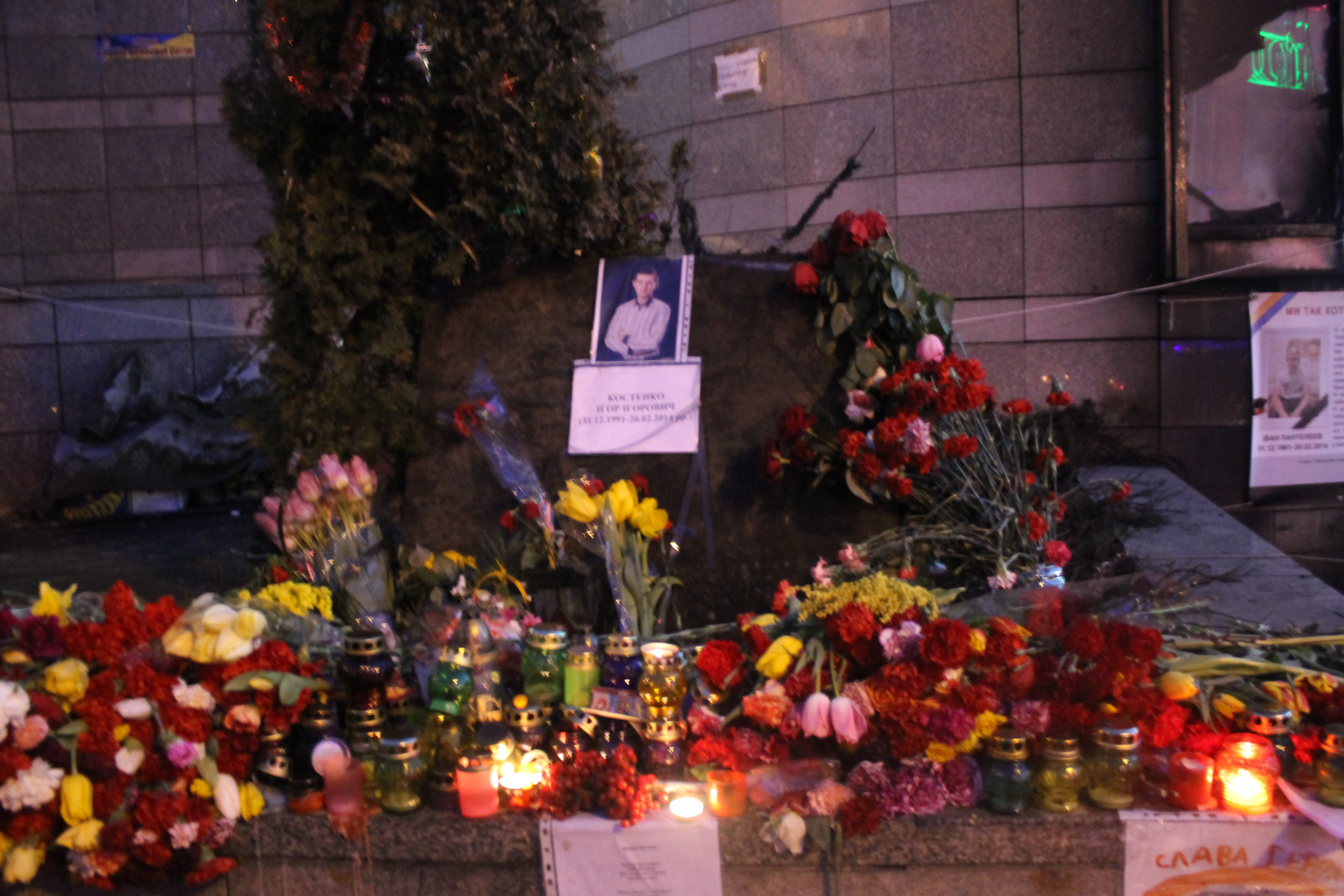
Flowers, photos and candles left on Instytutska Street where he was found

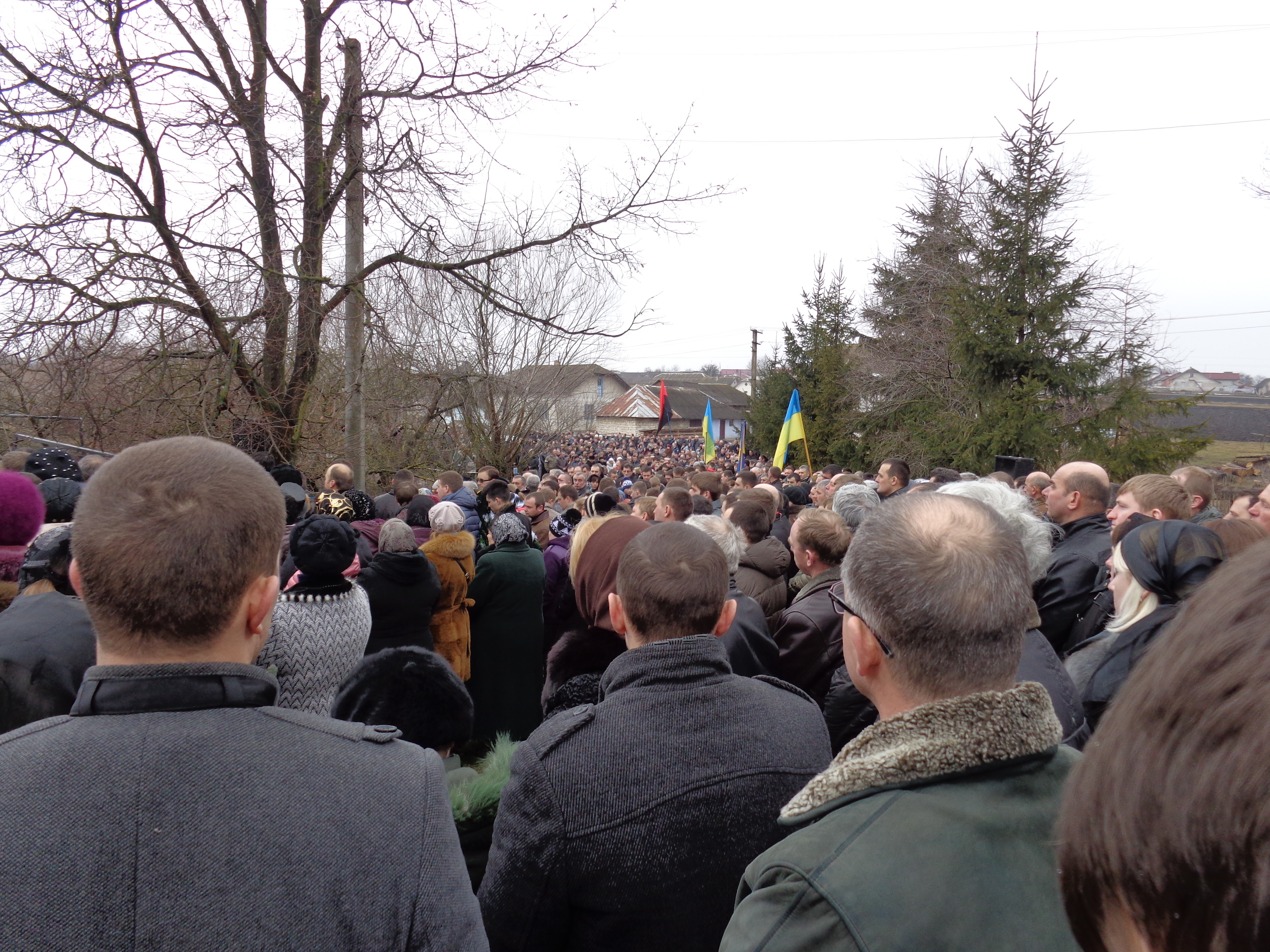
Funeral procession for Ihor Kostenko in Lviv

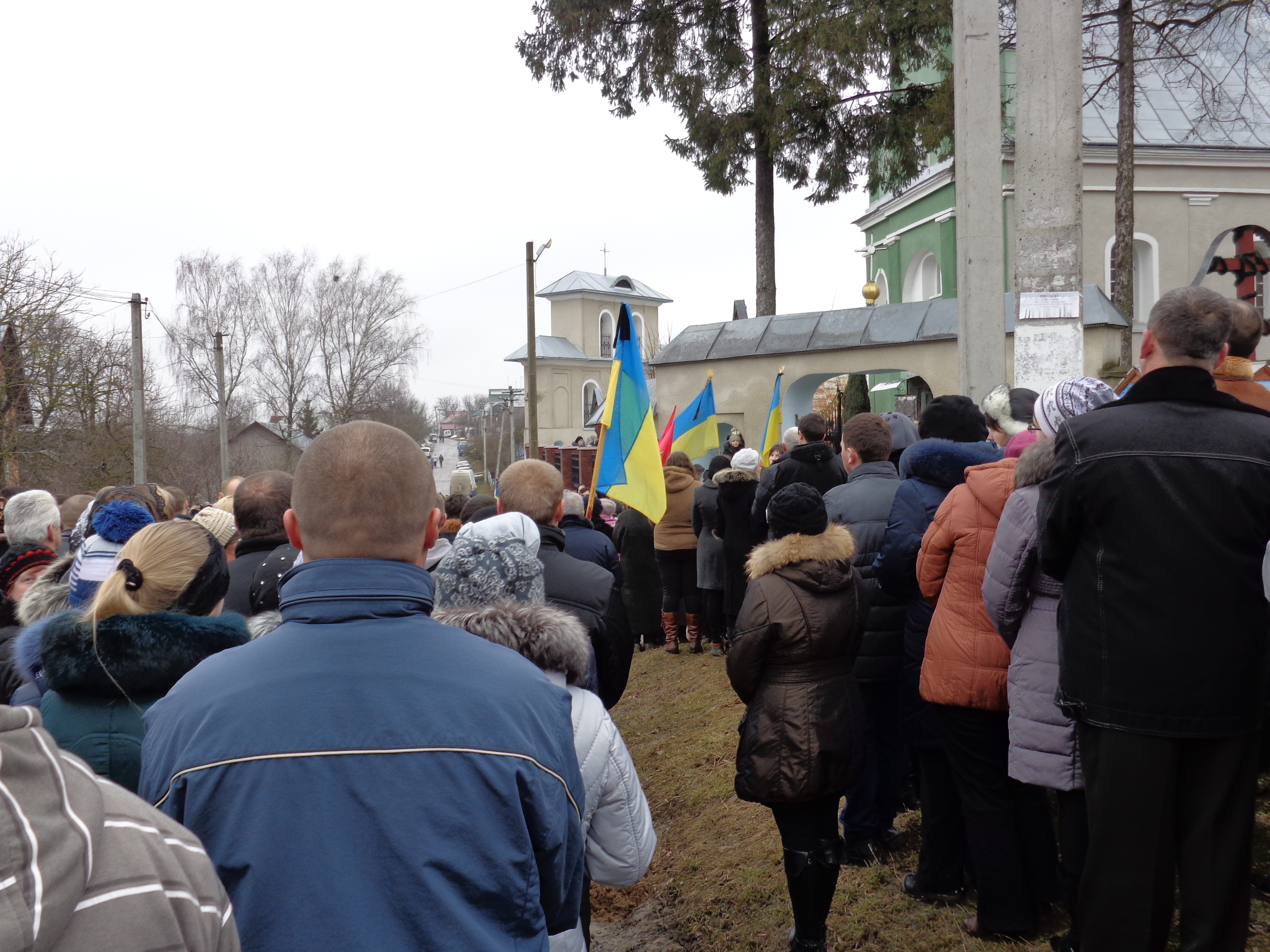
Crowd at the church for his funeral

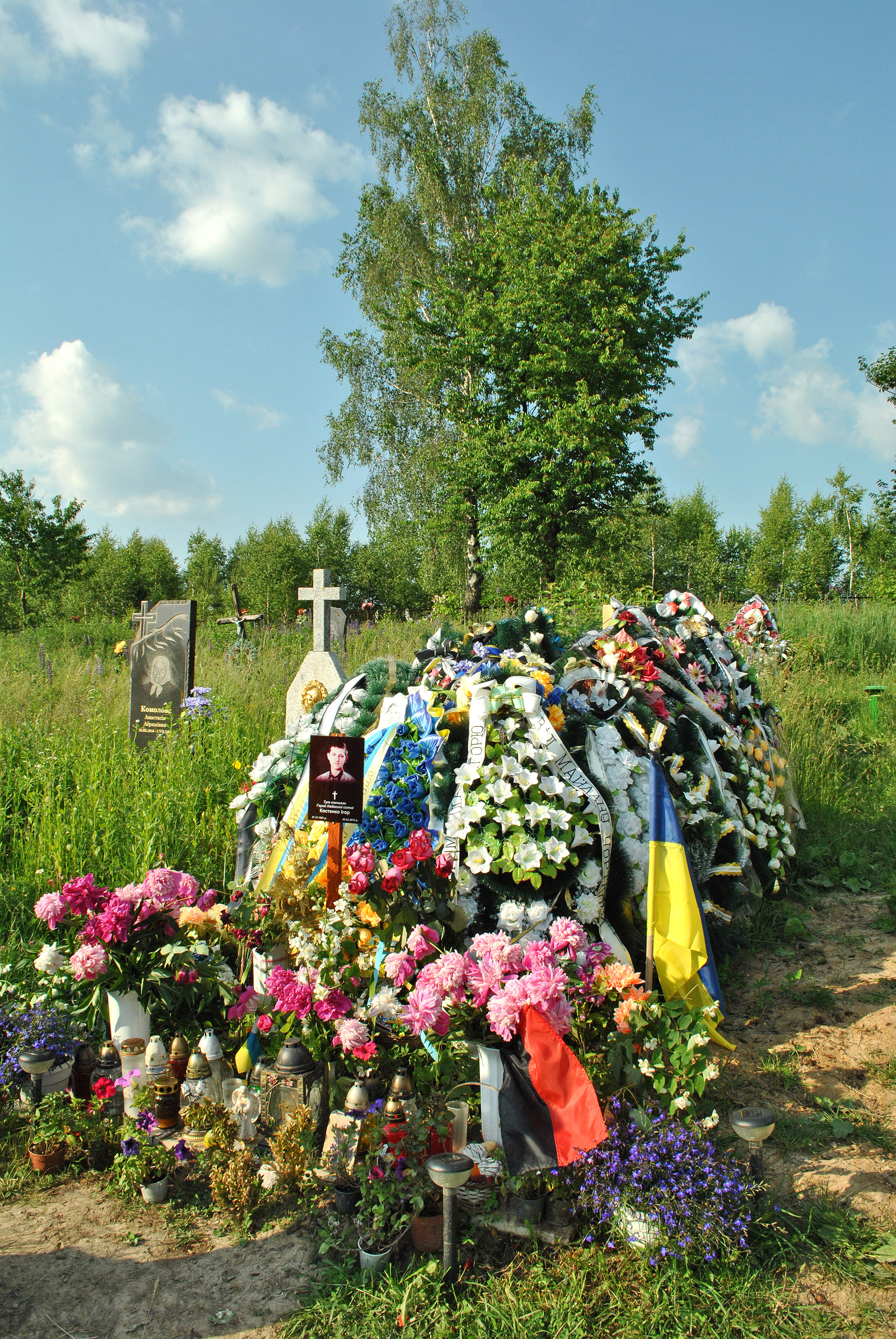
Ihor Kostenko's grave at the cemetery

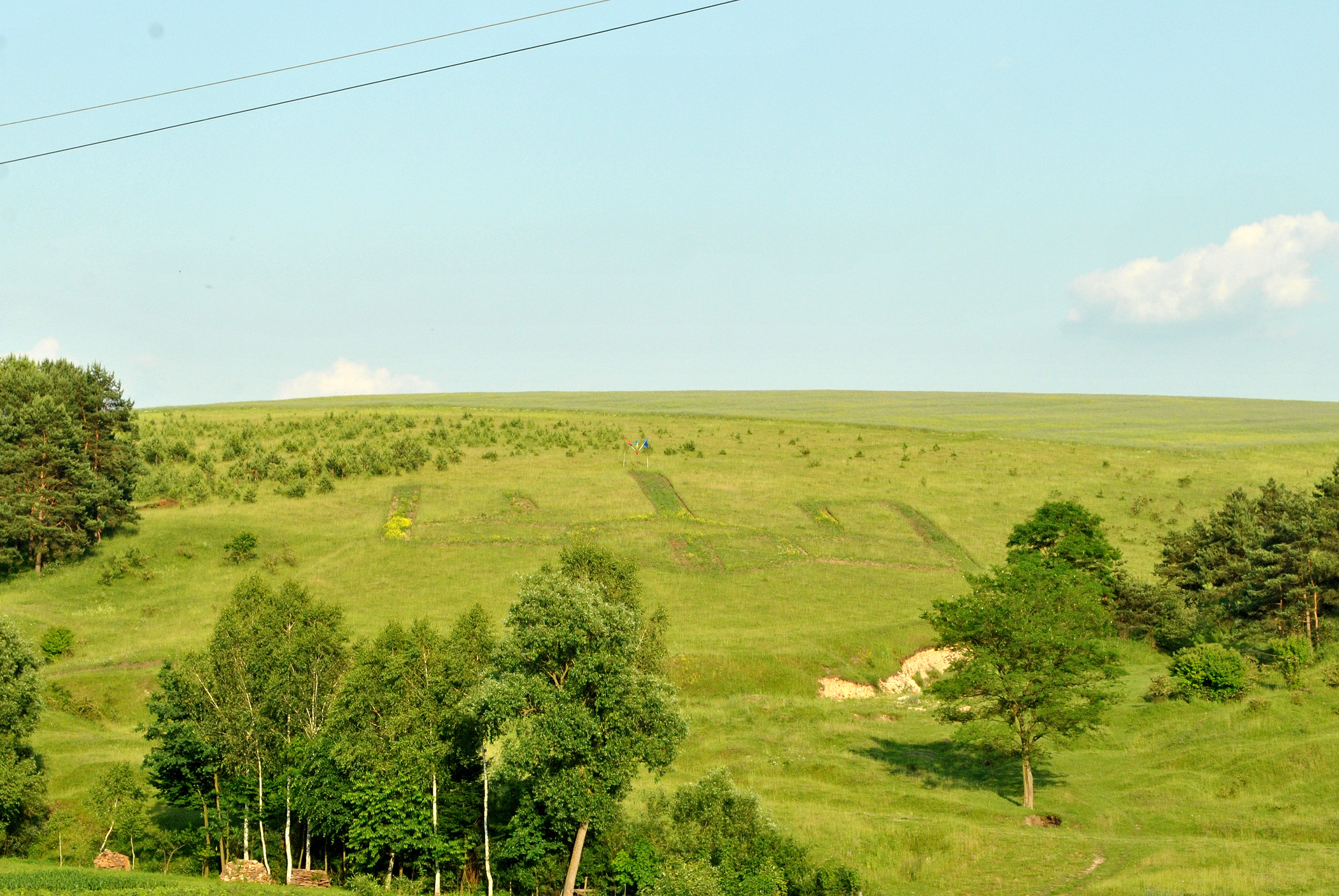
Ukrainian Trident planted in honor of Kostenko and Vasyl Moisei in Ternopil

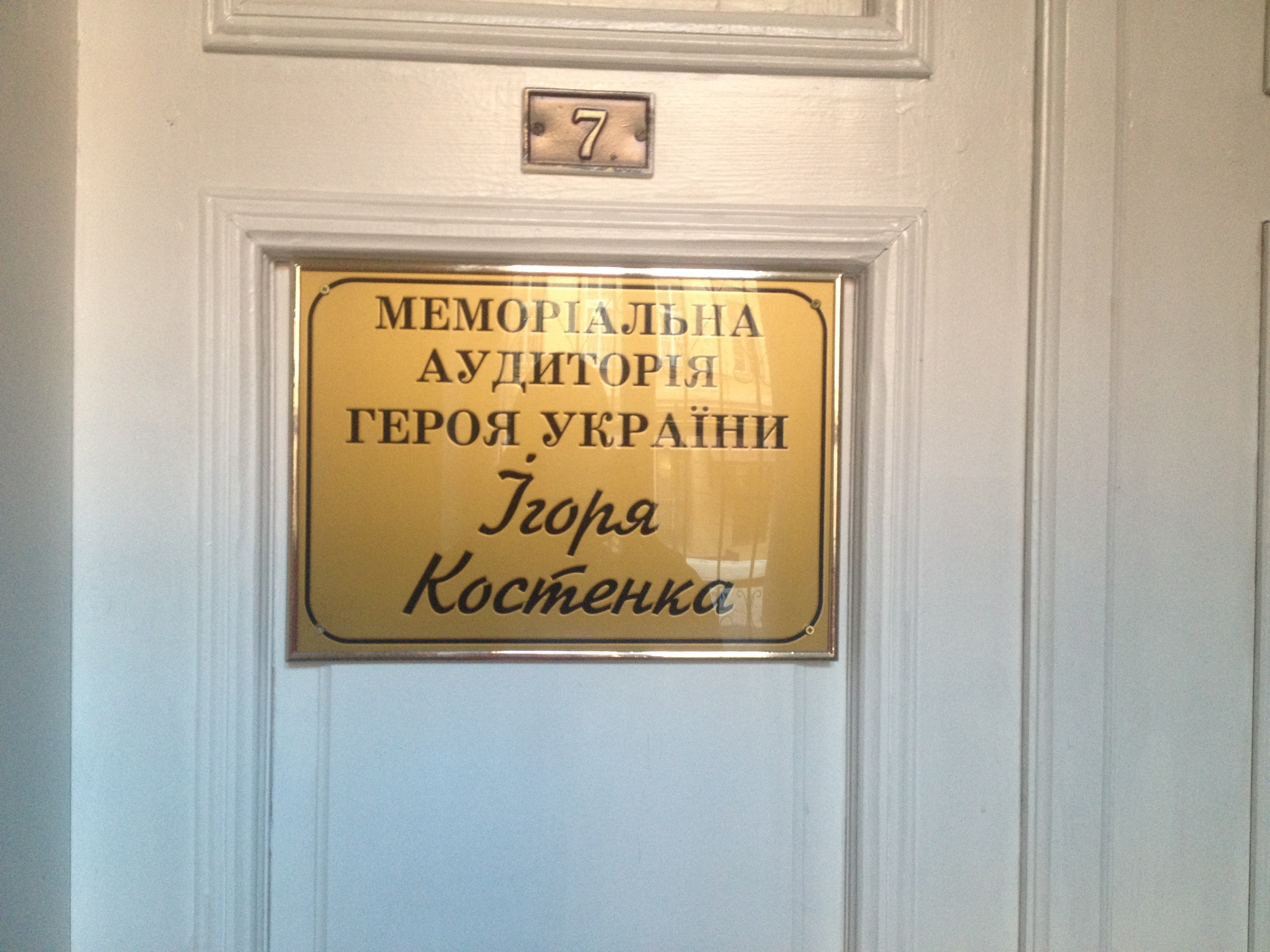
Plaque commemorating Kostenko at the University of Lviv

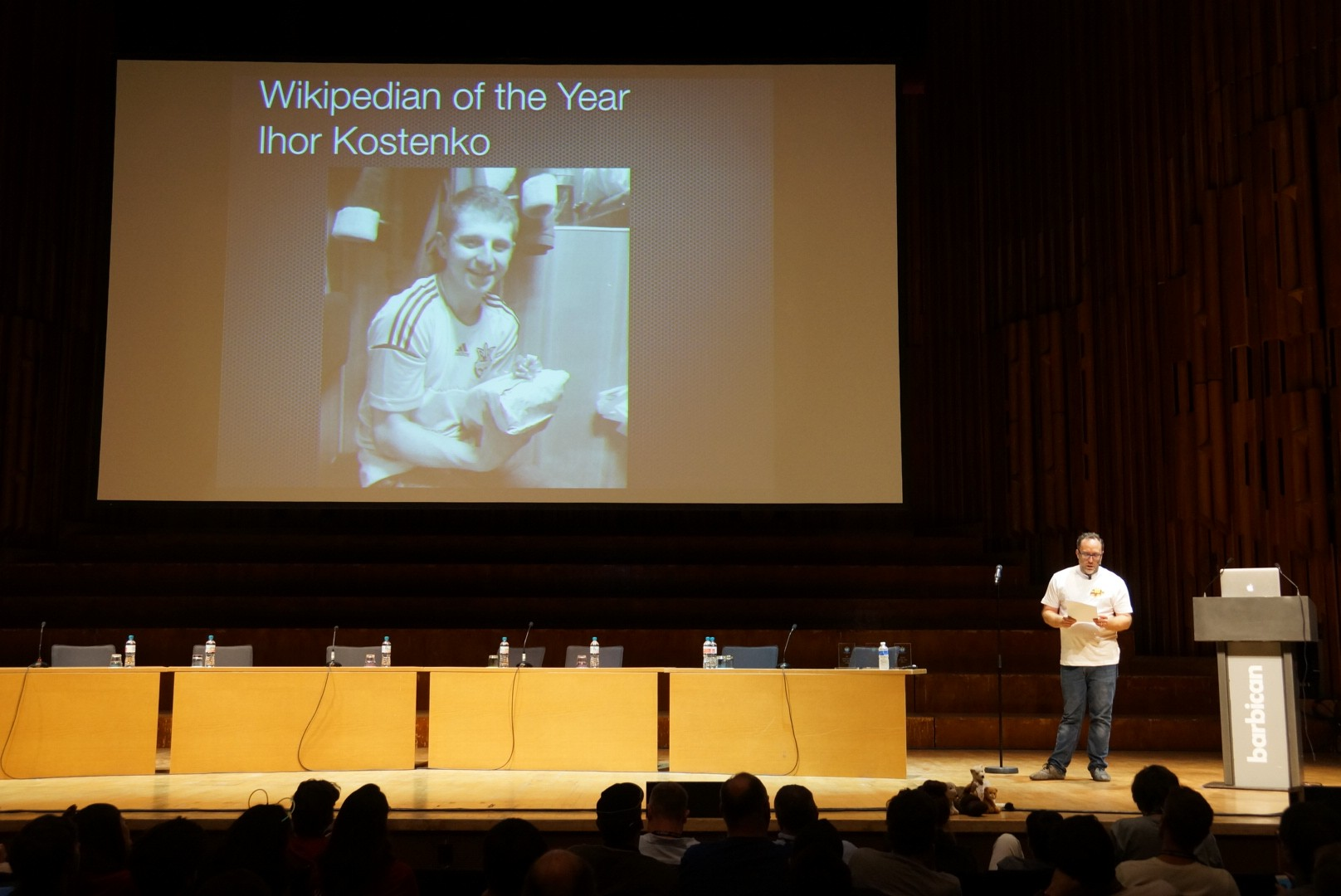
Jimmy Wales announces Kostenko as Wikipedian of the Year at Wikimania

== See also ==
- List of Wikipedia people
