= Sandister Tei =

Ghanaian journalist and Wikimedian

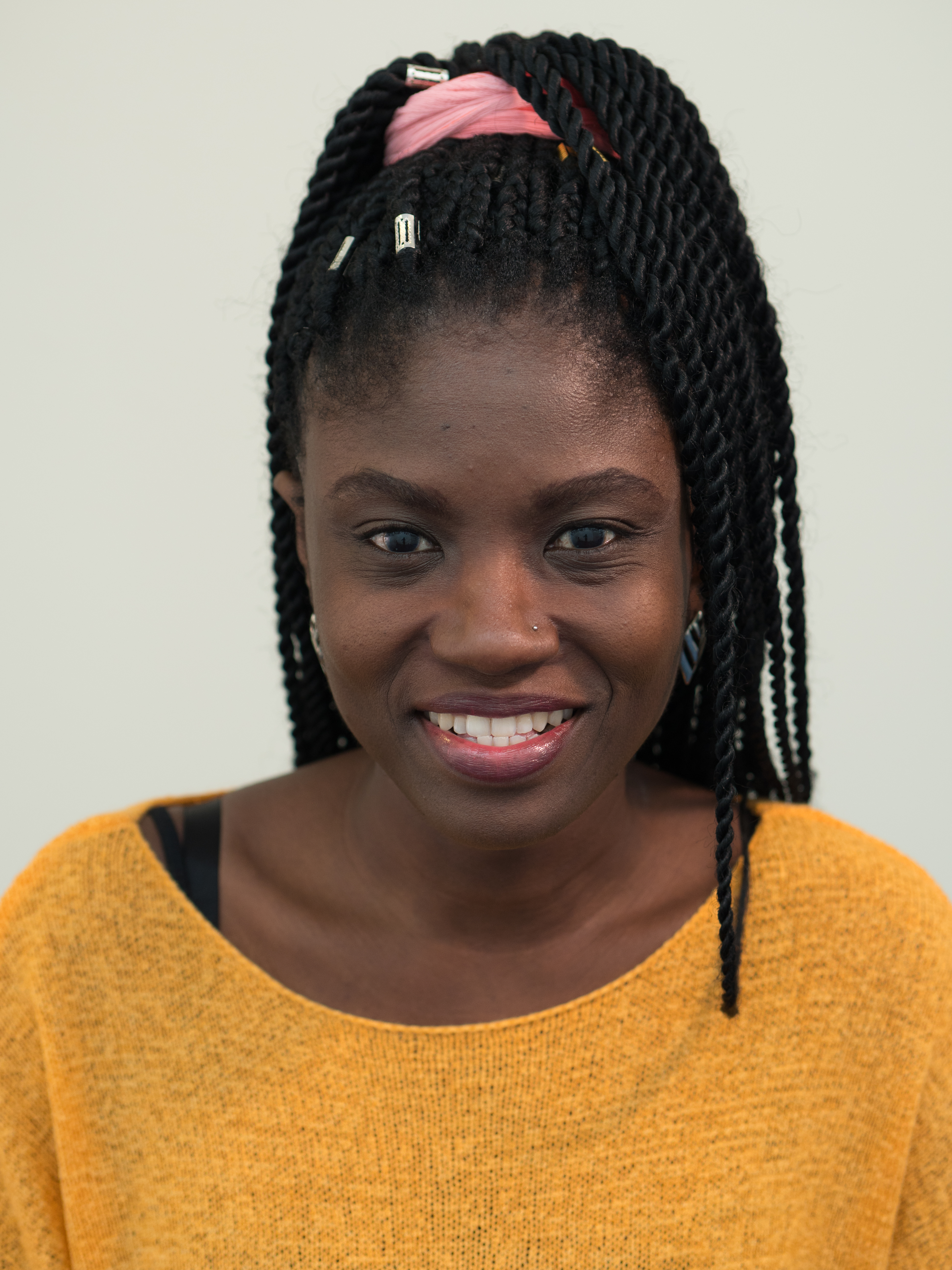
- Tei in 2019
- Born: Accra, Ghana
- Education: University of Ghana; Cardiff University (MA)
- Occupations: Journalist; Wikipedian
- Awards: Wikimedian of the Year (2020)

Sandister Tei (/ˈteɪ/ TAY) is a Ghanaian media professional who was named the Wikimedian of the Year in October 2020 by Wikipedia co-founder Jimmy Wales during Wikimania 2020. She is a co-founder and dedicated volunteer of the Wikimedia Ghana User Group.

== Early life and education ==
Tei was born in Accra, Ghana. She went to Achimota School, later the University of Ghana, where she majored in Geography and was awarded a scholarship by the Tullow Group in 2013 to take a master's degree in international journalism at Cardiff University.

== Career ==
Following her masters in Cardiff University, Tei joined Al Jazeera's digital channel AJ+ in 2014. She later worked at Joy FM briefly as a social media executive and moved to Citi FM as a multimedia journalist.

Tei later joined the Traffic Avenue drive time show as a side-kick for Jessica Opare-Saforo. She was also the presenter for Tech and Social Media trends on the award-winning Citi Breakfast Show.

Until she departed from Citi, she was the Deputy Programs Manager for Citi FM and Citi TV.

Aside from her roles in broadcast media, Tei also was a digital media trainer who facilitated training for Young African Leaders Initiative, Voice of America, Office of the Mayor of Accra.

Tei has worked for the Wikimedia Foundation since 2021.

== Wikimedia activity ==
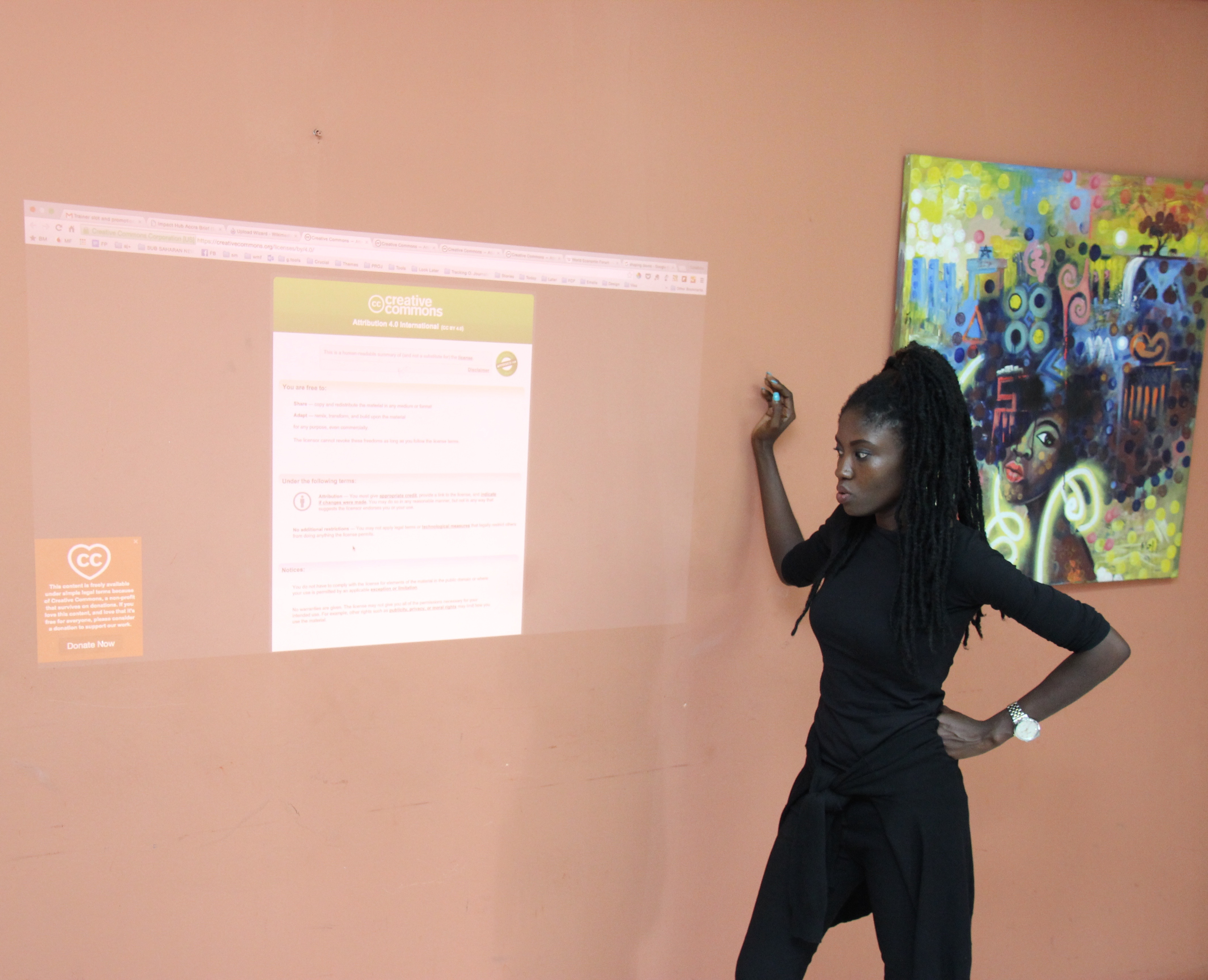
Tei during a 2016 Wikimedia edit-a-thon

Tei is the co-founder of Wikimedia Ghana User Group, a community of Ghanaian Wikimedians which was created in 2012. Her volunteer work there included recruiting Wikipedia editors and other outreach activities. She also helped launch a campaign to start a petition on Freedom of Panorama in Ghana in 2018 at re:publica Accra.

She represented Wikimedia Ghana User Group in Washington DC to confer with organizers of 2012 Wikimania about ways to increase African content on Wikipedia. The following year, she attended Wikimania in Hong Kong as part of a formal meetup of African editors, becoming the first woman in Ghana to attend such a meeting. She participated in the Wikimedia Summit 2019 in Berlin, promoting an increase in coverage on African topics on Wikimedia projects. One of her principal aims was to "realign" and "experience different perspectives".

She was named the Wikimedian of the Year on 15 October 2020 by Wikipedia co-founder Jimmy Wales in a live YouTube and Facebook broadcast. Tei was praised for her contributions to Wikimedia projects' coverage of the COVID-19 pandemic in Ghana, helping to keep a permanent record of the effects of the pandemic there. Because of travel restrictions, Wales could not personally deliver the award to Tei as per standard practice, but instead spoke to her in a surprise Zoom call.

== Other works ==
While in Wales, she was diagnosed with depression and her subsequent treatment helped improve both her mood and her grades; she then founded Purple People, a mental health support group (now inactive) for people with mood disorders, years after she battled depression herself.

== See also ==
- List of Wikipedia people
