= Zubrets =

Zubrets Зубрець
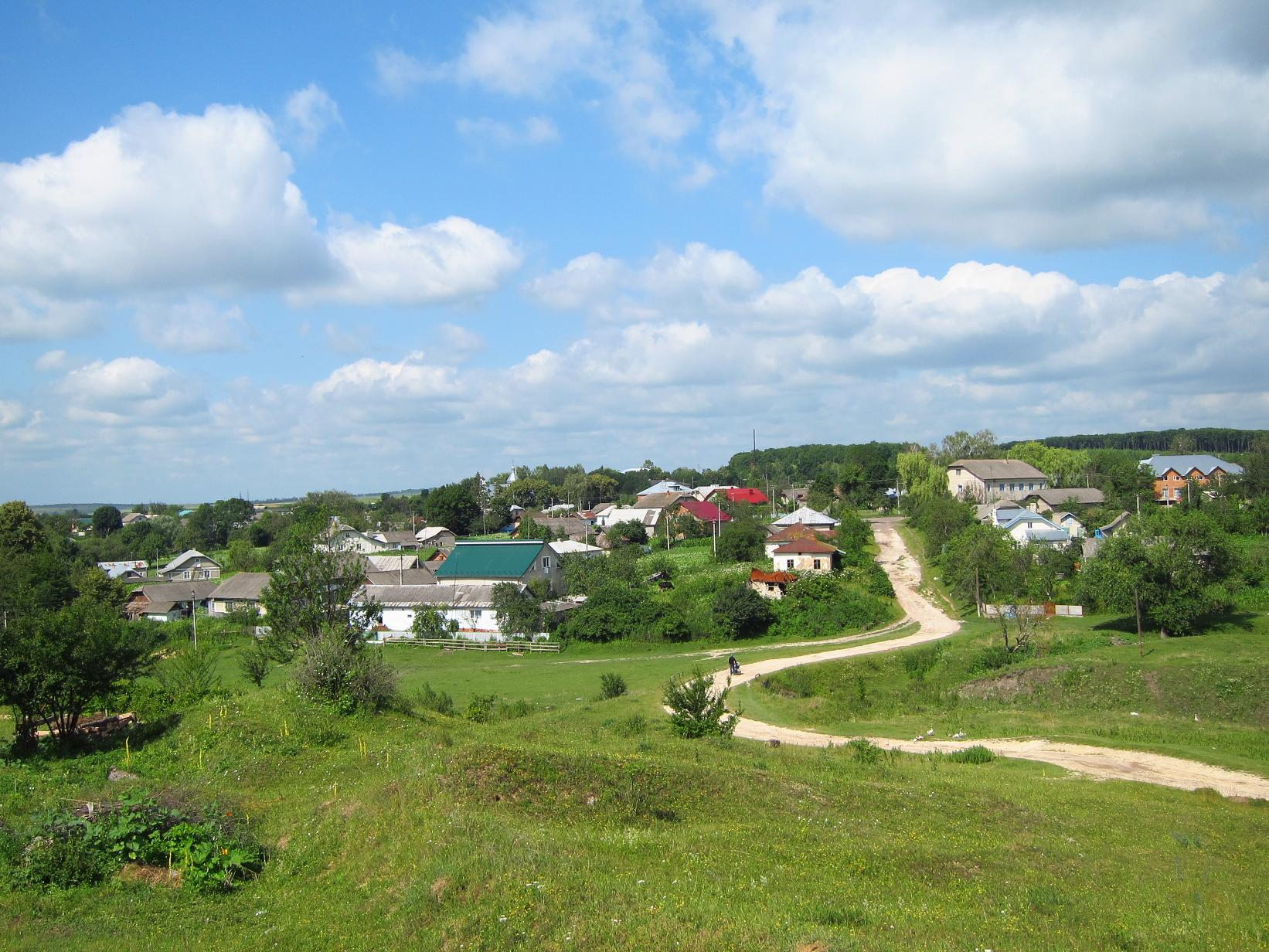

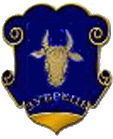
- Coat of arms

- Location within Ternopil Oblast
- Coordinates: 48°59′14″N 25°17′17″E
- Country: Ukraine
- Oblast: Ternopil Oblast
- Raion: Chortkiv Raion

Area
  - Total: 23.484 km^{2} (9.067 sq mi)
- Elevation: 342 m (1,122 ft)

Population (2001 census)
  - Total: 1,567
  - Density: 66.73/km^{2} (172.8/sq mi)
- Time zone: UTC+2 (EET)
  - Summer (DST): UTC+3 (EEST)
- Postal code: 48441
- Area code: +380 3544

Zubrets (Ukrainian: Зубрець) is a village in Chortkiv Raion (district) of Ternopil Oblast (province) in western Ukraine. It belongs to Buchach urban hromada, one of the hromadas of Ukraine.

Until 18 July 2020, Zubrets belonged to Buchach Raion. The raion was abolished in July 2020 as part of the administrative reform of Ukraine, which reduced the number of raions of Ternopil Oblast to three. The area of Buchach Raion was merged into Chortkiv Raion.

== Famous people ==
Activist Ihor Kostenko (1991–2014) who was killed during the Euromaidan events was born here.
