= Alaa Najjar =

Physician and Wikimedian

- علاء نجار
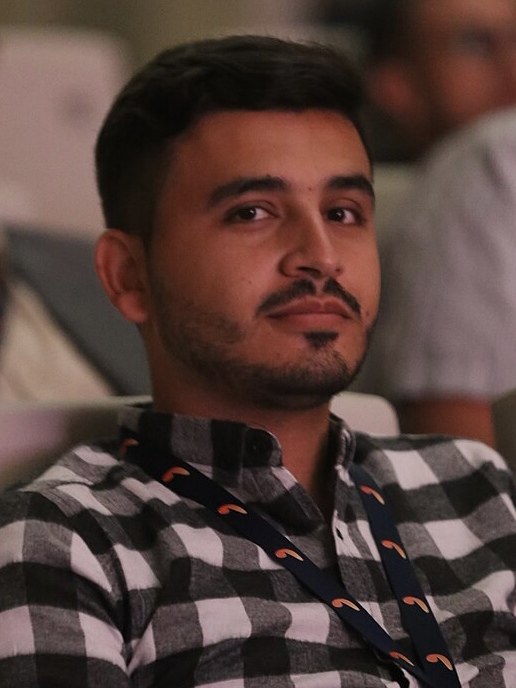
- Najjar in 2022
- Education: Alexandria University (MB BS)
- Occupations: Physician; researcher; Wikipedian
- Awards: Wikimedian of the Year (2021)

Alaa Najjar (Arabic: علاء نجار, romanized: ʿAlāʾ Najjār, pronounced [ʕalaːʔ nadʒːaːr]) is a physician, Wikipedian and internet activist. He was named the Wikimedian of the Year at Wikimania in August 2021 by Wikipedia co-founder Jimmy Wales for his pioneering role in the development of the Arab and medical communities as well as for his role in the development of COVID-19 topics.

Najjar is an active contributor to WikiProject Medicine and a volunteer administrator in the Arabic Wikipedia and a Wikimedia steward. He was a board member of Wikimedians of the Levant User Group and an editorial board member of the WikiJournal of Medicine.

== Education and career ==
Najjar graduated from Alexandria University, faculty of medicine in January 2021 with a Bachelor of Medicine, Bachelor of Surgery (MB Bch). In 2021, he told The National that he was employed in “a very busy public hospital”.

== Wikipedia and Wikimedia activities ==
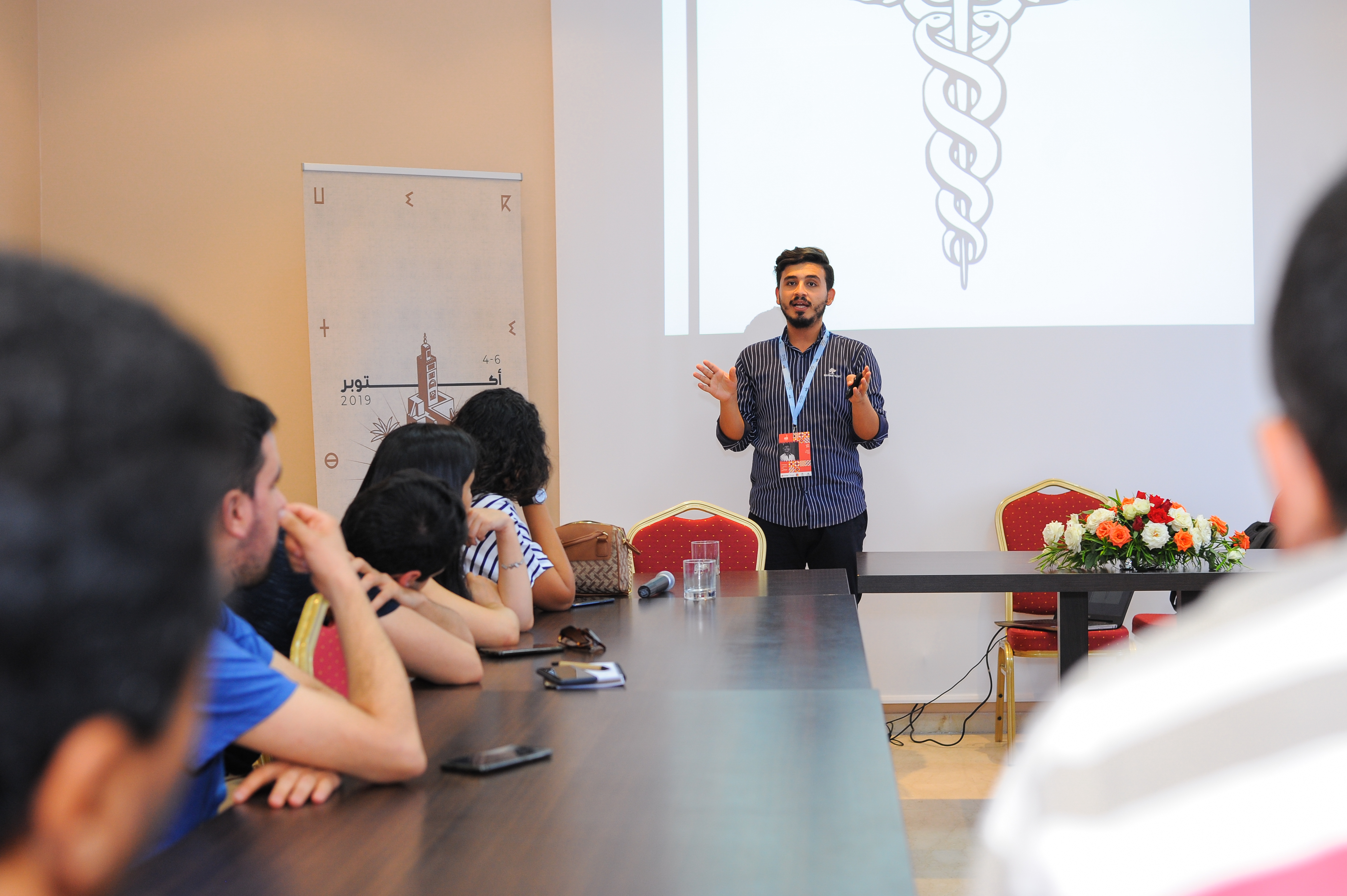
Najjar presenting about WikiProject Medicine at WikiArabia 2019

Najjar is an active contributor since 2014, and most of his edits focus on medicine-related articles. He also serves as an administrator on Arabic-language Wikipedia and in several other roles on different projects of Wikimedia Foundation. He is also a board member of Wikimedia Group in the Levant and editorial board member of the WikiJournal of Medicine since December 2018. Also, he is a member on the Arabic Wikipedia's official social networking team.

He spearheaded the COVID-19 project on the Arabic encyclopedia and majorly contributes to the WikiProject Medicine. Najjar's work helps to combat medical misinformation and confront the pandemic with reliable, fact-checked information.

He was named the Wikimedian of the Year on 15 August 2021 by Wikipedia co-founder Jimmy Wales. Najjar was praised for his pioneering role in the development of the Arab and medical communities as well as for his role in the development of COVID-19 topics. Because of travel restrictions, Wales could not personally deliver the award to Najjar as per standard practice, but instead spoke to him in a surprise Google Meet call.

== Publications ==
- Sellar Xanthogranulomatosis in a Two-Year-Old Girl: A Case Report. Cureus, 2023.
- Complex presentation of a left Fronto-zygomatic Dermoid cyst: a case report. Journal of surgical case reports, 2024.
- Glioblastoma multiforme in a patient with neurofibromatosis type 1: a case report and review of literature. Journal of surgical case reports, 2024.

== See also ==
- List of Wikipedia people
