= Carma Citrawati =

Indonesian writer, literature activist and Wikipedian

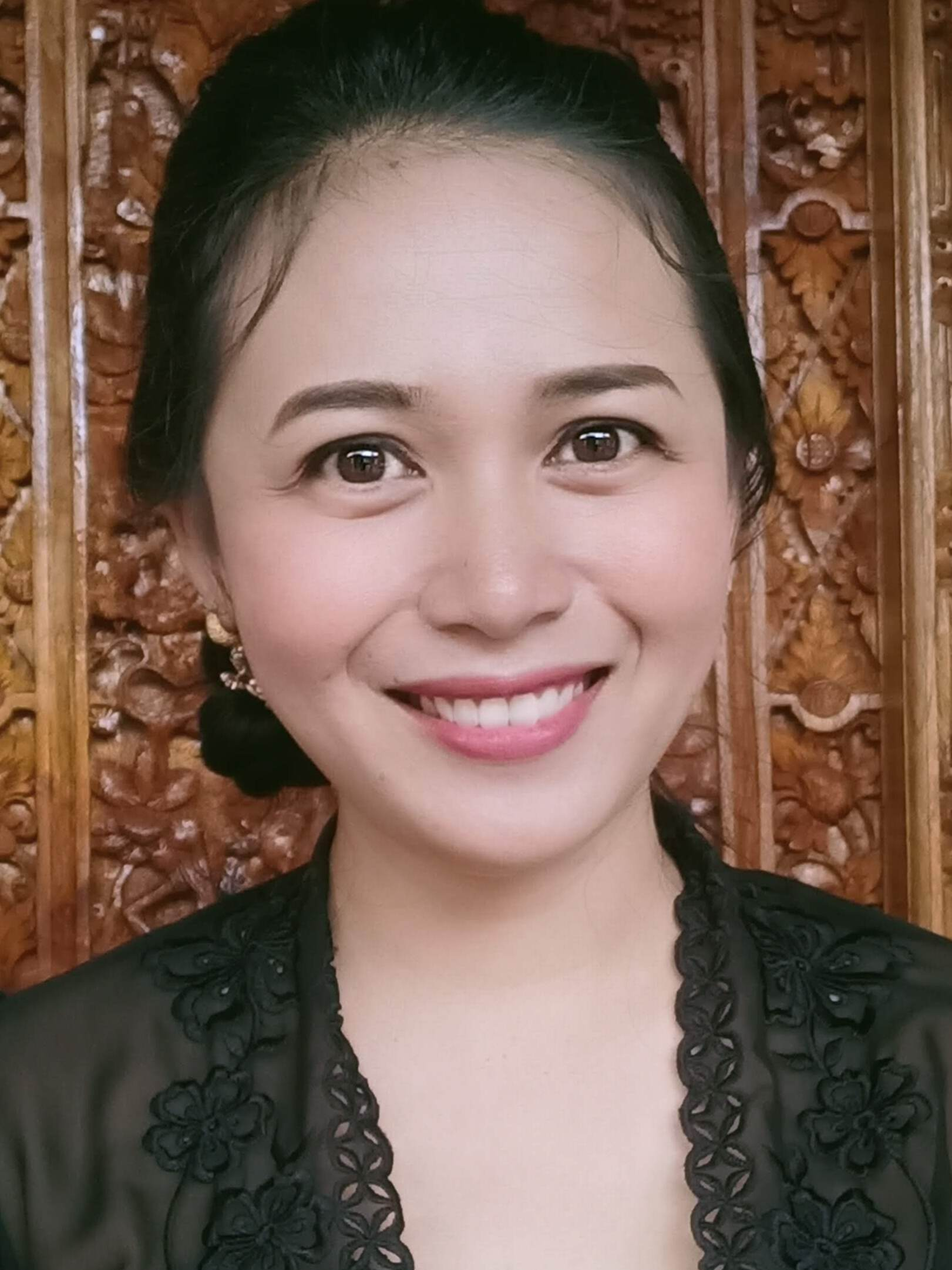
- Citrawati in 2021
- Born: 24 February 1990 (age 35); Banjarangkan, Klungkung, Indonesia
- Education: SMA Negeri 1 Banjarangkan
- Alma mater: Udayana University
- Occupations: Writer; Wikimedian; literature activist
- Known for: Pioneering tasks to digitize and translate ancient Balinese manuscripts
- Awards: Wikimedian Newcomer of the Year (2021)

Dewa Ayu Carma Citrawati (born 24 February 1990) is an Indonesian writer, Balinese literature activist, and Wikimedian. She is well known for pioneering tasks to digitize and translate ancient Balinese palm-leaf manuscripts. On 15 August 2021, she was conferred with the award Wikimedian Newcomer of the Year during the 2021 virtual Wikimania conference.

== Personal life ==
She was born in her family as the eldest child in her family. She has four siblings.

She was married to I Gedé Gita Purnama Arsa Putra, also known as Bayu Gita, who died on 25 February 2023.

== Career ==
She attended the SMA Negeri 1 Banjarangkan for her secondary education. She then graduated from the Department of Language and Literature of Bali at Udayana University and completed her master's degree at the university's Department of Pure Linguistics. She then began her career working as a Balinese language teacher at SMPN 3 Denpasar from 2011 to 2018.

She pursued her interest in the Balinese language at a young age as a hobby and began researching about the history of the language, which was in danger of being abandoned in Indonesia due to the emergence of the Indonesian language.

She also writes short stories and poems in the Balinese language. She wrote and published her first short story anthology Smara Reka (2014) in collaboration with her husband, I Gedé Gita Purnama Arsa Putra. She later wrote another short story anthology titled Kutang Sayang Gemel Madui (2016) for which she received the Rancage Literary Award in 2017 from the Rancagé Cultural Foundation. Kutang Sayang Gemel Madui contains 13 short stories with the theme of social criticism. She was invited as a speaker at the 2018 Ubud Writers & Readers Festival.

== Wikimedia ==
She began her involvement in the Wikimedia project in 2019 and developed WikiPustaka in order to build an online library consisting of Balinese language sources for the Balinese community. She was announced as the Wikimedian Newcomer of the Year at the 2021 Wikimania conference.
