= Carmen Alcázar =

Mexican Wikipedian, feminist and activist

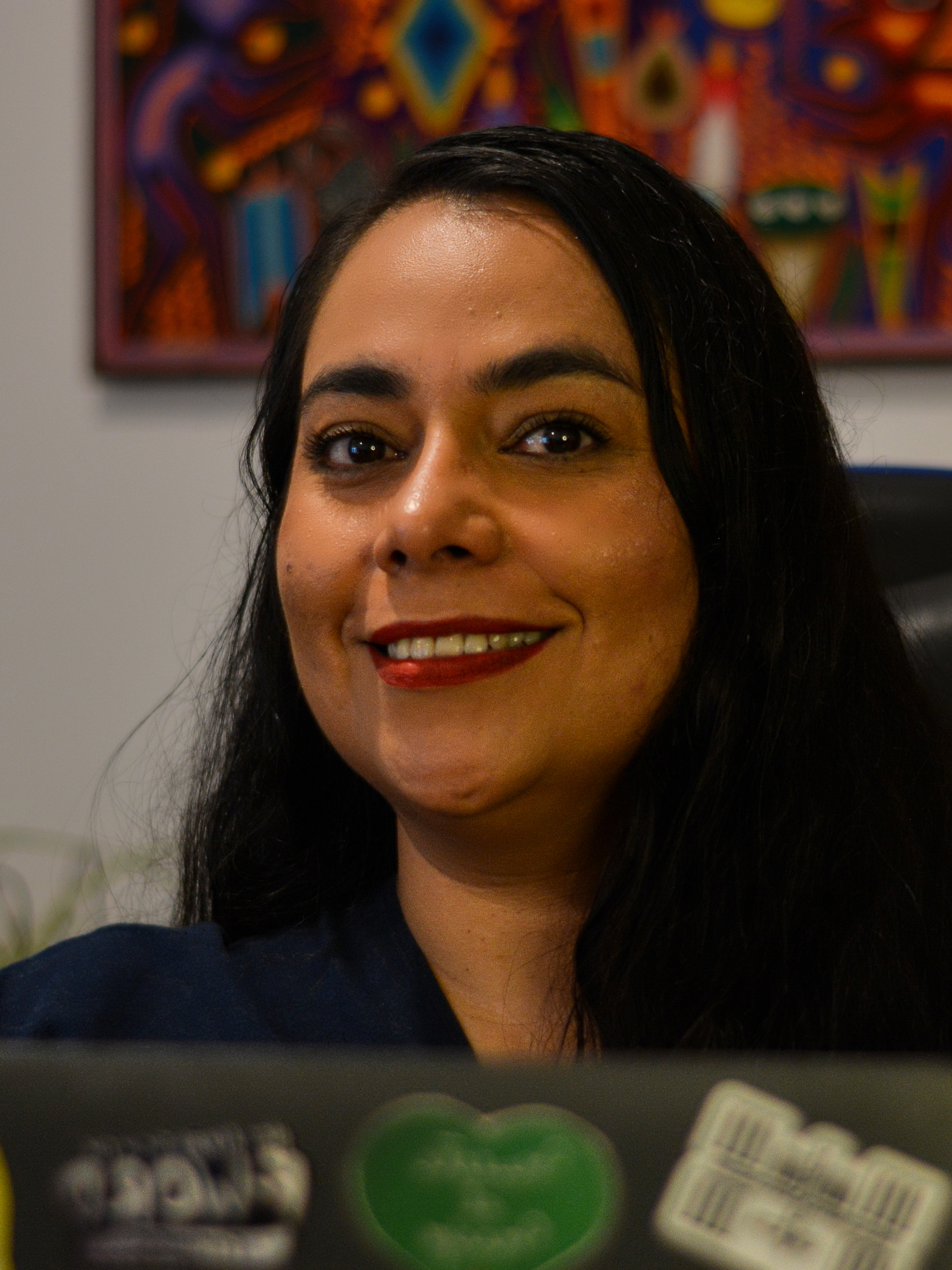
- Alcázar in August 2021
- Born: Carmen Alcázar Castillo
- Occupations: Political scientist; feminist; activist; Wikipedian

Carmen Alcázar Castillo (Spanish pronunciation: [ˈkaɾmen alˈkasaɾ kasˈtiʝo]) is a Mexican political scientist, feminist, women's rights activist and Wikipedian. In 2021, she received the Wikimedian of the Year honorable mention by Wikipedia co-founder Jimmy Wales at Wikimania.

== Biography ==
Carmen Alcázar holds a degree in political science and public administration. She has been a Wikipedia editor since 2011.

== Wikimedia work ==
In 2015, Alcazar created the Editatona project to decrease the existing gender gap in the Wikipedia encyclopedia, since then the project has been replicated in 10 Spanish and Portuguese-speaking countries. She served as president of Wikimedia Mexico from 2018 to 2021, when she became its executive director.

== See also ==
- List of Wikipedia people
