= Human Factor (TV series) =

Human Factor (Armenian: «Մարդկային գործոն») is an Armenian weekday television news broadcast and talk show, first aired on 10 June 2013 on Armenia TV. It aims to address difficult social issues.

== Links ==
- «Արմենիա» հեռուստաընկերության կայքում
- Հաղորդումներ
