= Google Student Ambassador Program =

Global program for tertiary students

- Abbreviation: GSA
- Type: Educational, promotional
- Region served: Global
- Hosting corporation: Google

The Google Student Ambassador Program is a global program that is aimed at active tertiary students from all academic backgrounds. It is an opportunity for students to act as liaisons between Google and their universities and also an opportunity for Google to contribute to the education of future leaders. The program selects campus leaders from the Bachelors and Masters levels for skill development collaboration opportunities. The program focuses on hosting technical events focusing on Gemini.

== Purpose ==
The program was developed to enforce Google's efforts in empowering students and to helping selected students make the best of Google's technologies and adequately prepare for their future careers.

GSA's work involved:

- Act as a liaison between Google and university.
- Working with local Google teams.
- Create awareness about Google's products and brand on their respective campuses.
- Spread news about Google programs, events and other opportunities (competitions, training opportunities, scholarships, etc.).
- Build relationships on campus with faculty and student groups on behalf of Google.
- Test new Google products and features.
- Spread Google's goodwill to students on their campuses.
