= Armenian Wikipedia =

Armenian-language edition of Wikipedia

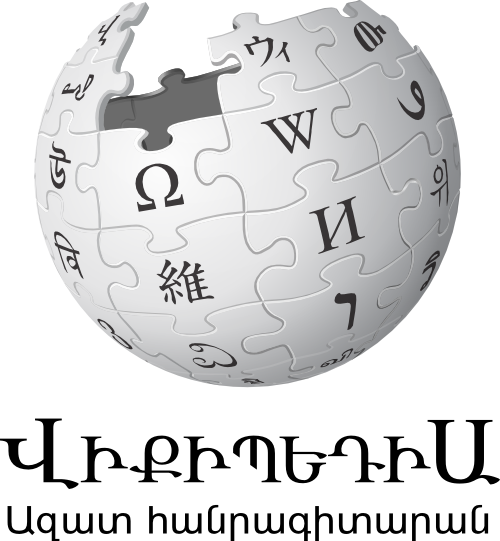

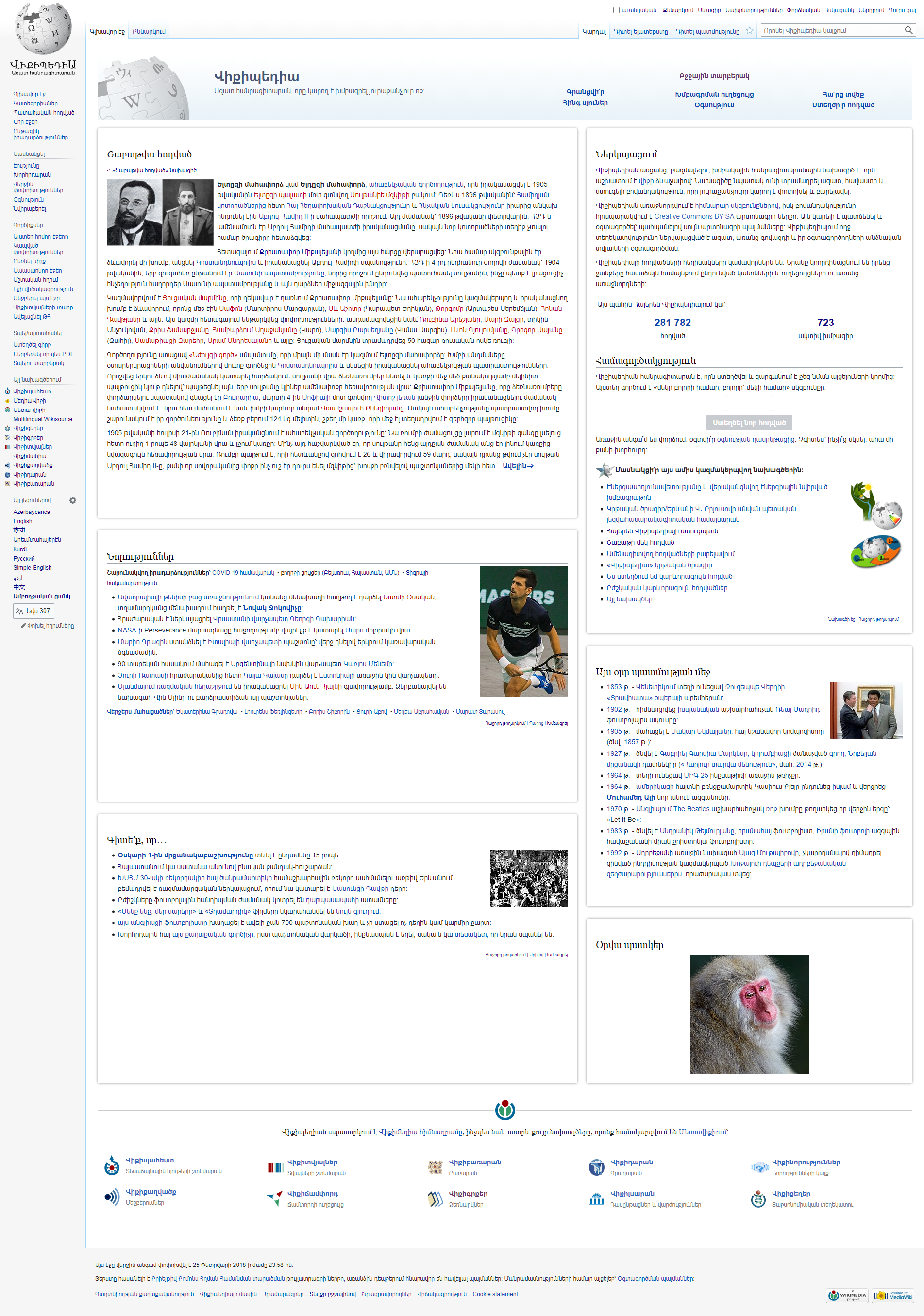
- Screenshot Screenshot of the Armenian Wikipedia page
- Website type: Internet encyclopedia project
- Available in: Armenian
- Owner: Wikimedia Foundation
- Creator: Armenian wiki community
- Website: hy.wikipedia.org
- Commercial: No
- Registration: Optional
- Launched: 9 July 2003; 23 years ago
- Content license: Creative Commons Attribution/ Share-Alike 4.0 (most text also dual-licensed under GFDL); Media licensing varies

The Armenian Wikipedia (Armenian: Վիքիպեդիա or Վիքիպեդիա Ազատ Հանրագիտարան, romanized: Vikipedia or Vikipedia Azat Hanragitaran; Western Armenian: Ուիքիփետիա) is the Armenian language version of Wikipedia.

It was created in February 2003 as Հայերեն Վիքիփեդիա, but started developing in 2005. The name was changed to Հայերեն Վիքիպեդիա on 5 April 2012. With all of its current content, it is listed in List of Wikipedias in the 100,000+ category.

Armenian Wikipedia launched later the option of reading all contents, if preferred, in traditional (Mesrobian) orthography, rather than the Reformed (Abeghian) orthography. Armenian Wikipedia also carried at times parallel articles in Western Armenian language spoken widely in the Armenian diaspora.

On 1 April 2019 however, a separate site was launched in Western Armenian under the name Հայերէն Ուիքիփետիա with a project of moving Western Armenian materials there and expanding content in the new Western Armenian Wikipedia space.

== Statistics ==
It has 332,098 articles. It also has 175,628 registered contributors, including ten administrators.

On 29 July 2023, it reached 300,000 articles.

== Language ==
The Armenian language used is mainly the Eastern Armenian dialect. However, the Armenian Wikipedia is inclusive, and also contains articles of interest in the Western Armenian dialect, which is predominantly spoken in the Armenian Diaspora.

Some articles have separate Eastern and Western Armenian versions. In those cases, the articles' secondary dialect is positioned at the top right corner of the article with the primary dialect. Articles in Western Armenian used to be distinctly categorized at Category: Wikipedia Articles in Western Armenian.

== Western Armenian Wikipedia ==
Western Armenian Wikipedia
- Website type: Internet encyclopedia project
- Available in: Western Armenian
- Owner: Wikimedia Foundation
- Creator: Armenian wiki community
- Website: hyw.wikipedia.org
- Commercial: No
- Registration: Optional
- Launched: 1 April 2019; 7 years ago
- Content license: Creative Commons Attribution/ Share-Alike 4.0 (most text also dual-licensed under GFDL); Media licensing varies

In January 2018, an incubator area was launched in Western Armenian at incubator.wikipedia.org/wiki/Wp/hyw in preparation for a possible launch of a separate Wikipedia in Western Armenian.

In April 2019, the Western Armenian Wikipedia was launched at hyw.wikipedia.org․ Because of different transliteration rules of Western Armenian, the new wiki was named Ուիքիփետիա instead of Վիքիպեդիա as in Eastern Armenian as used in the main Armenian Wikipedia.

== History ==
=== Name change ===
The Armenian Wikipedia was originally named Վիքիփեդիա (Vikʻipʻedia) but in 2012 it was renamed Վիքիպեդիա (Vikʻipedia). The letter պ (pē) replaced the letter փ (pʻiwr) to reflect the unaspirated pronunciation used in the Eastern Armenian dialect, the official form of the language as used in Armenia; however, the revised spelling is not consistent with the Western Armenian transliteration. The discussion and decision to make the change were done in two phases, and the change was put in effect on 5 April 2012.

=== "One Armenian, One Article" ===
On 24 March 2014, both Wikimedia Armenia and the Human Factor (Armenian: «Մարդկային գործոն») launched a promotion called "One Armenian, One Article" (Armenian: «Մեկ հայ՝ մեկ հոդված»). This mass-media campaign was promoted on several Armenian television stations. The plan aimed to increase both the quantity and quality of Armenian Wikipedia articles. In addition to expanding the Armenian language's presence on Wikipedia, it would raise the level of each article to reflect the rich history of the Armenian people as well as their current, flourishing position in the contemporary world.

The project hoped to organize Wiki-meetings of representatives of science, art and other subjects with the aim of familiarizing them with the Wiki-culture and helping them in making their own contributions in the development of the Armenian Wikipedia. The campaign would be conducted with training and incentive programs, as well as joint activities with educational and cultural institutions and organizations.

The "One Armenian, One Article" campaign was shown on the Human Factor TV program that aired on 24 March 2014 on Armenia TV. The campaign was subsequently popularised by many other information agencies.

There was a news conference on the "One Armenian, One Article" All-Armenian project on 27 March 2014. In July 2014, BBC News reported that as a result of the campaign, the Armenian Wikipedia appeared to be outnumbering its neighboring countries with its more than 125,000 pages, compared to approximately 102,000 pages on the Azerbaijani Wikipedia and almost 84,000 pages on the Georgian Wikipedia. The campaign was supported by the Armenian government as well. Education Minister Armen Ashotyan publicly stated, "One Armenian, One Article – I will definitely do that and believe you will too." Defense Minister Seyran Ohanyan said that he created a Wikipedia entry on the Armenian Army.

== Gallery ==
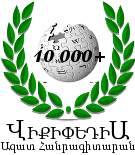
Armenian Wikipedia's 10,000 articles logo (3 August 2010)

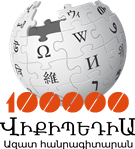
Armenian Wikipedia's 100,000 articles logo (2 December 2013)

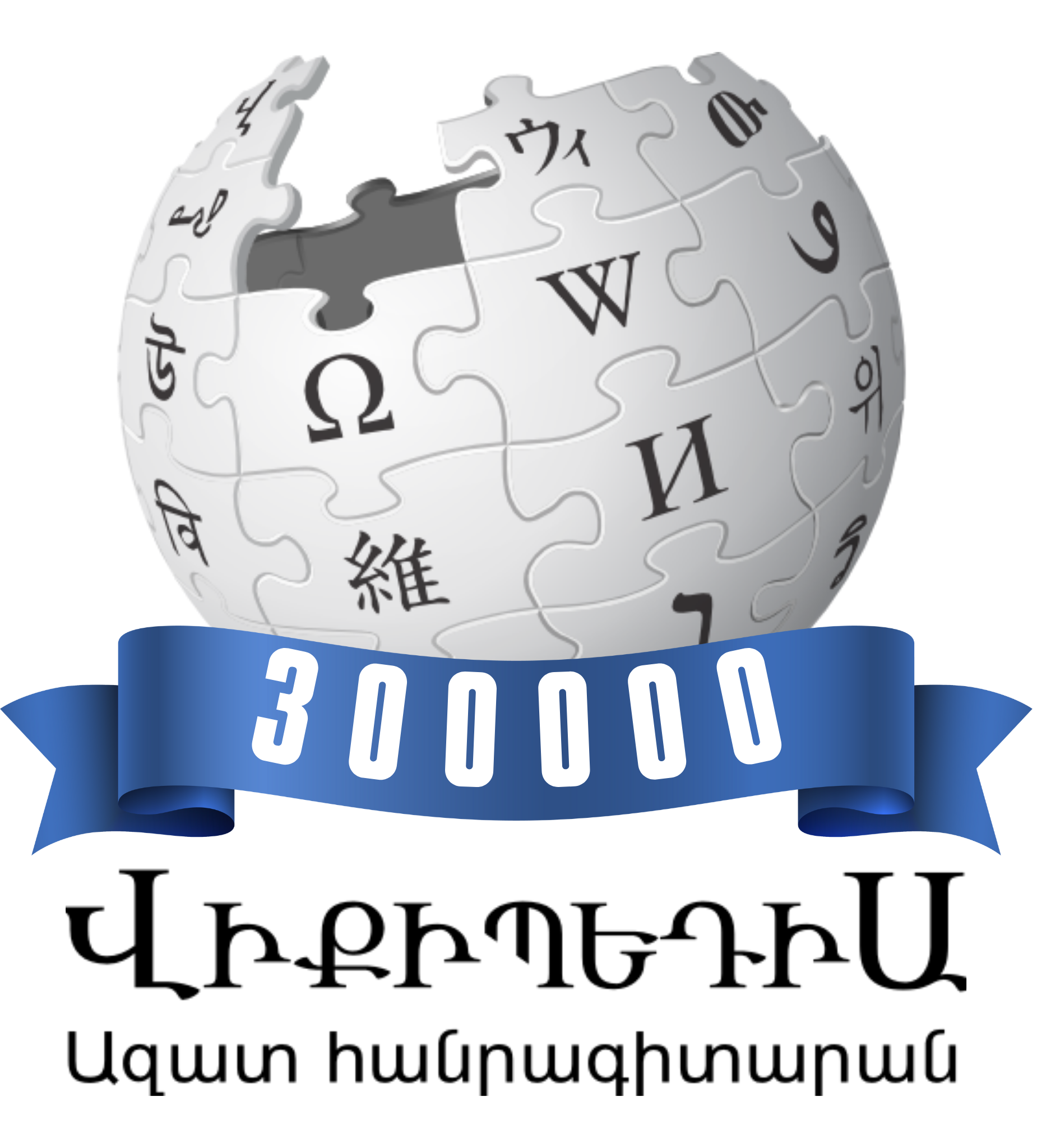
Armenian Wikipedia's 300,000 articles logo (29 July 2023)

== See also ==
- List of Wikipedias
