= Wikimedia Ukraine =

Regional chapter of Wikimedia Foundation in Ukraine

- Вікімедіа Україна

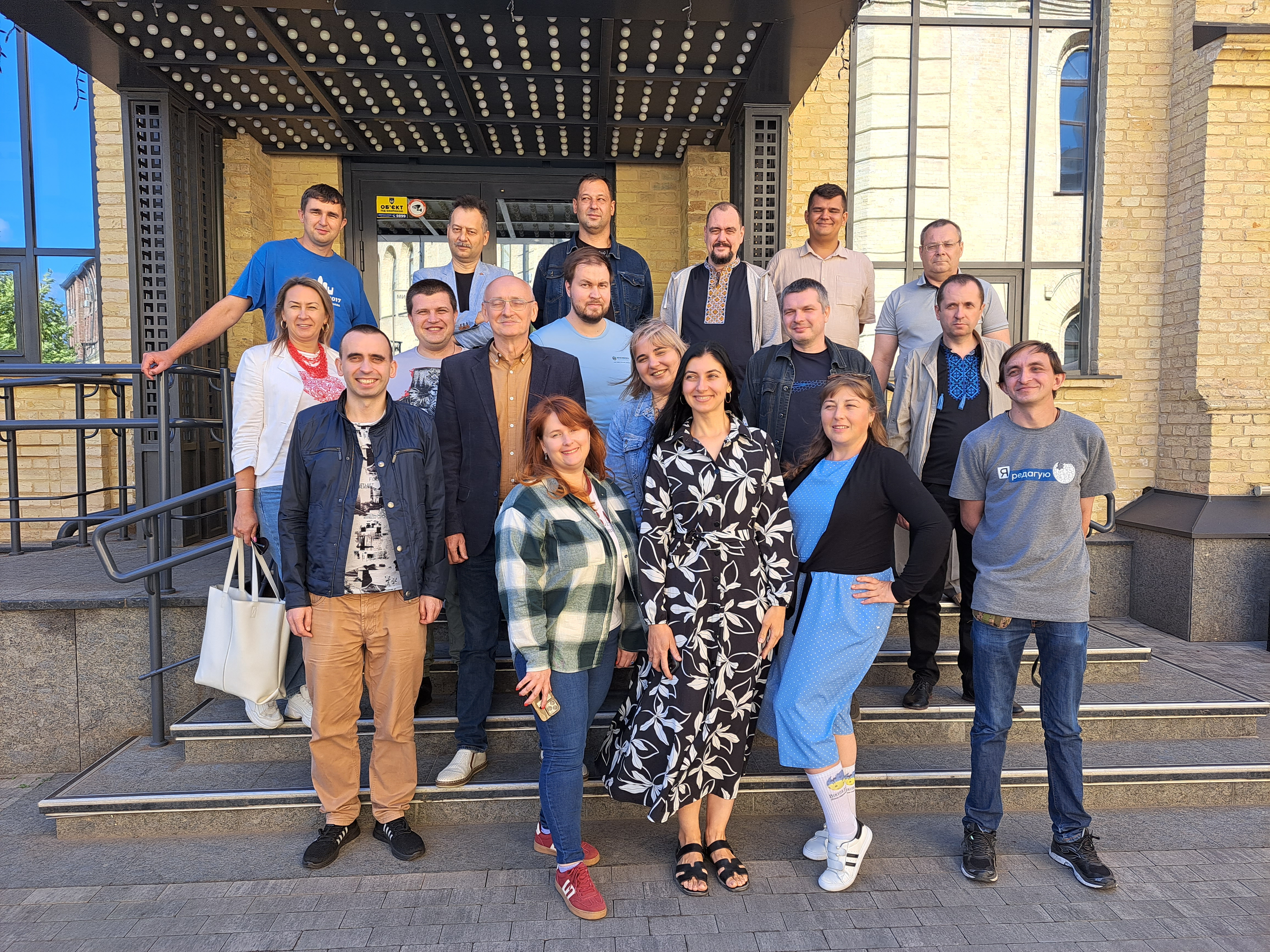
- Part of members of the organization during Annual general meeting in 2024.
- Abbreviation: WMUA / ВМУА
- Formation: 31 May 2009
- Type: Nonprofit organization
- Legal status: Public benefit organization
- Purpose: To help people and organisations create and preserve open knowledge, to support various Wikimedia-related initiatives and to help provide easy access for all.
- Headquarters: 01001, Kyiv, Kniaziv Ostrozkykh St. 2 (de-facto); 01001, Kyiv, Levandovska St. 3-V (official)
- Location: Kyiv, Ukraine
- Coordinates: 50.4419°N 30.543°E
- Region served: Ukraine
- Methods: Public outreach
- Members: 67 (as of February 2026)
- Chair: Ilya Korniyko
- Deputy chairs: Anton Obozhyn (secretary); Mykola Kozlenko (treasurer); Valentyn Nefedov
- Chief manager: Anton Protsiuk
- Affiliations: Wikimedia Foundation
- Staff: 7
- Website: ua.wikimedia.org

Wikimedia Ukraine is the regional chapter of the Wikimedia Foundation in Ukraine. The chapter was created on May 31, 2009. On this day the First Annual Meeting was held and the Board was elected.

On July 3, 2009, the Wikimedia Foundation approved Wikimedia Ukraine as its regional chapter.

On July 13, 2009, Wikimedia Ukraine received a certificate of registration of organization from the Ministry of Justice of Ukraine.

== Board of Management ==
As of October 2024, the Board comprises:

- Ilya Korniyko (Chair)
- Mykola Kozlenko (Treasurer)
- Anton Obozhyn (Secretary)
- Valentyn Nefedov (Deputy chair)
- Vyacheslav Mamon
- Natalia Lastovets
- Kateryna Kifa

== See also ==
- m:Wikimedia Ukraine
