= List of Wikipedia people =

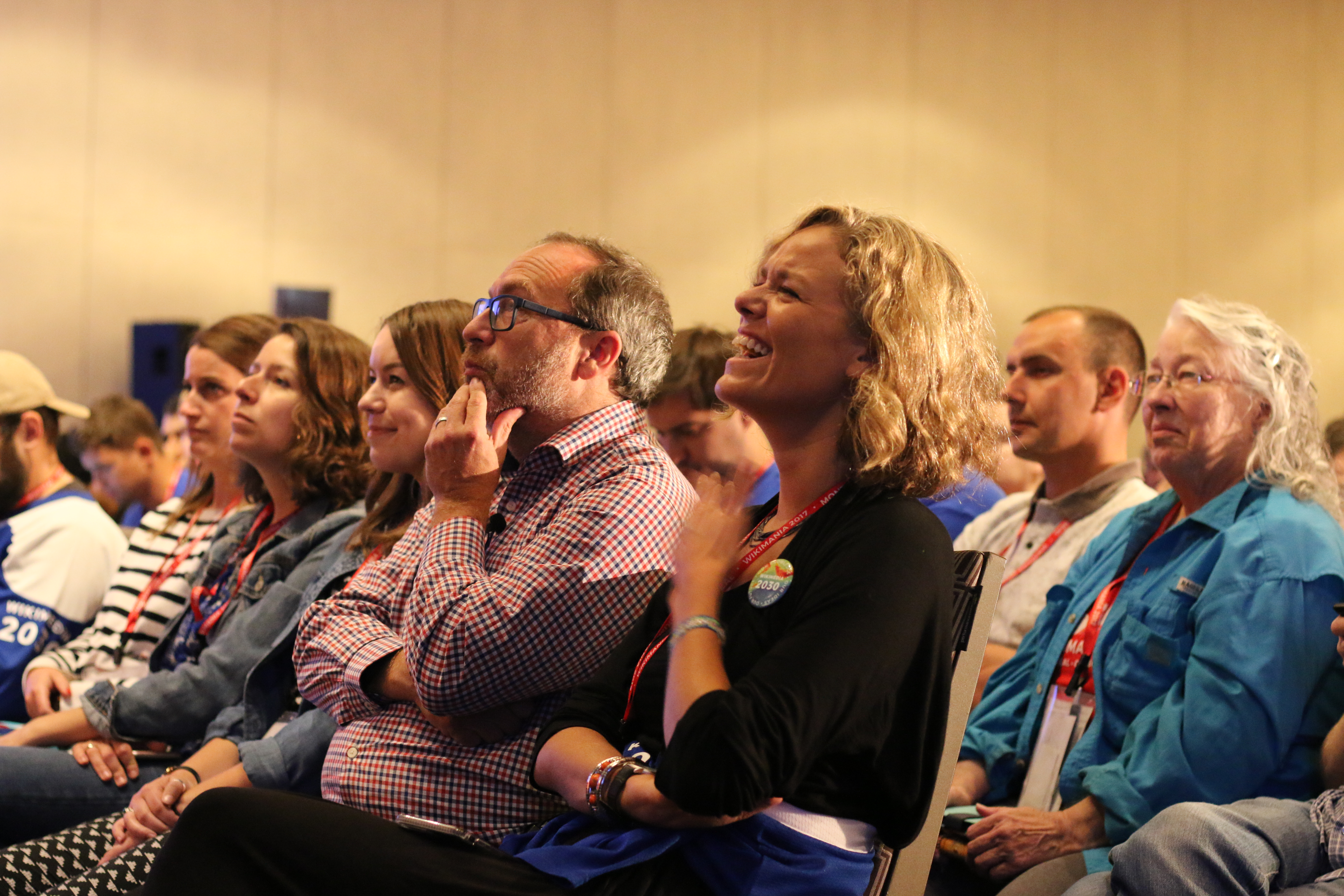
Wikipedia co-founder Jimmy Wales (center, in a plaid shirt), former Wikimedia Foundation executive director Katherine Maher (center, in a black shirt), and other Wikipedians at the 2017 Wikimania in Montreal

This list includes notable editors of the online encyclopedia Wikipedia who create and maintain the site, known as Wikipedians, as well as other notable people associated with the project and the larger Wikipedia community.

== A ==
- Evan Amos, New York City-based professional photographer known for his numerous stock images of video game consoles, which are frequently used in Wikipedia articles
- Amin Azzam, American psychiatrist and clinical professor at the UCSF School of Medicine known for teaching a class of medical students which consists entirely of editing Wikipedia articles

== B ==
- Nicholson Baker, author and conservationist who "fell in love with Wikipedia"
- Mark Bernstein, Russian Wikipedia editor and blogger from Belarus, detained for participating in anti-Lukashenko protests
- Yaroslav Blanter, Russian nanoscientist, administrator of Russian Wikipedia until 2012 and English Wikipedia since 2013

== C ==
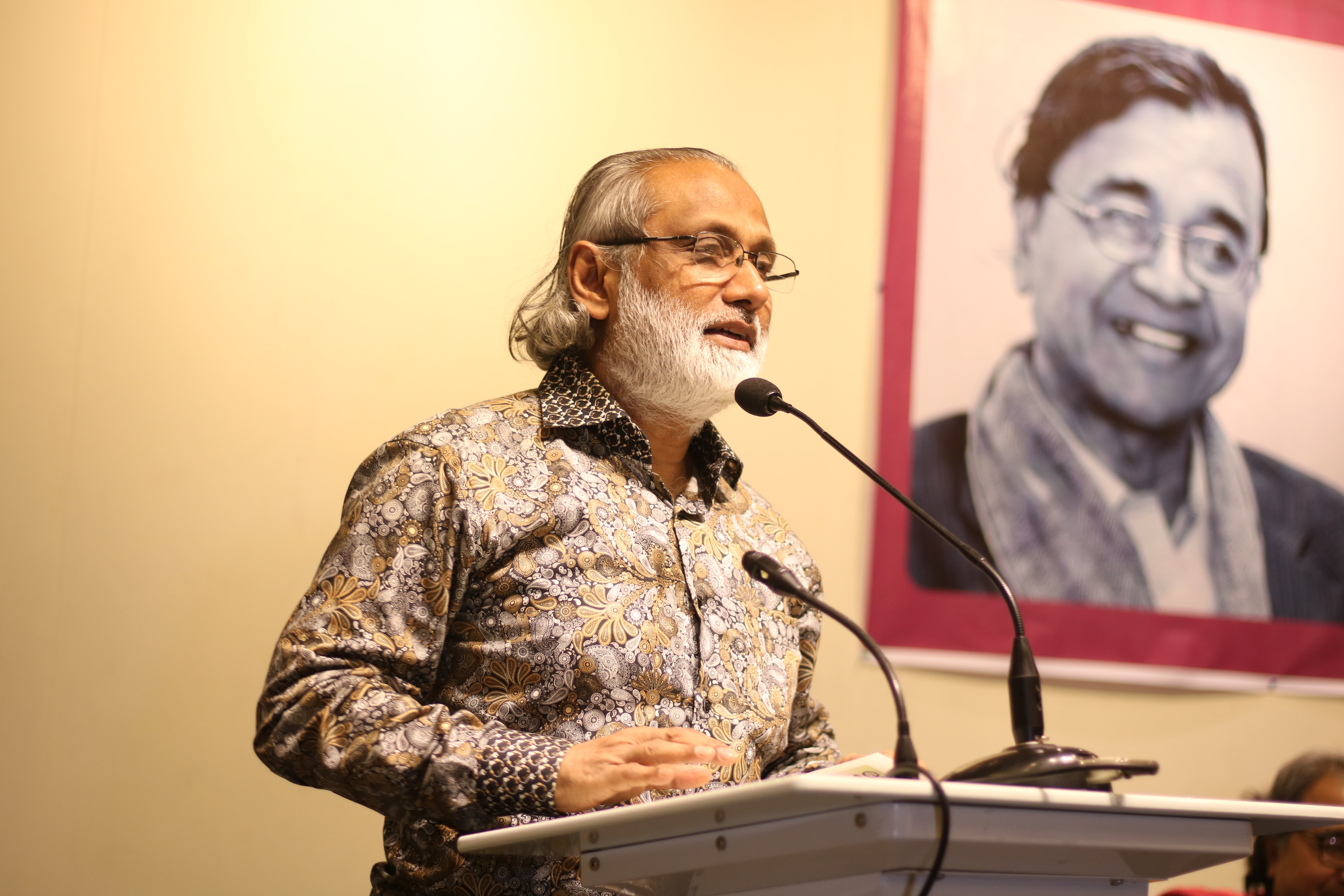
Faizul Latif Chowdhury in 2017

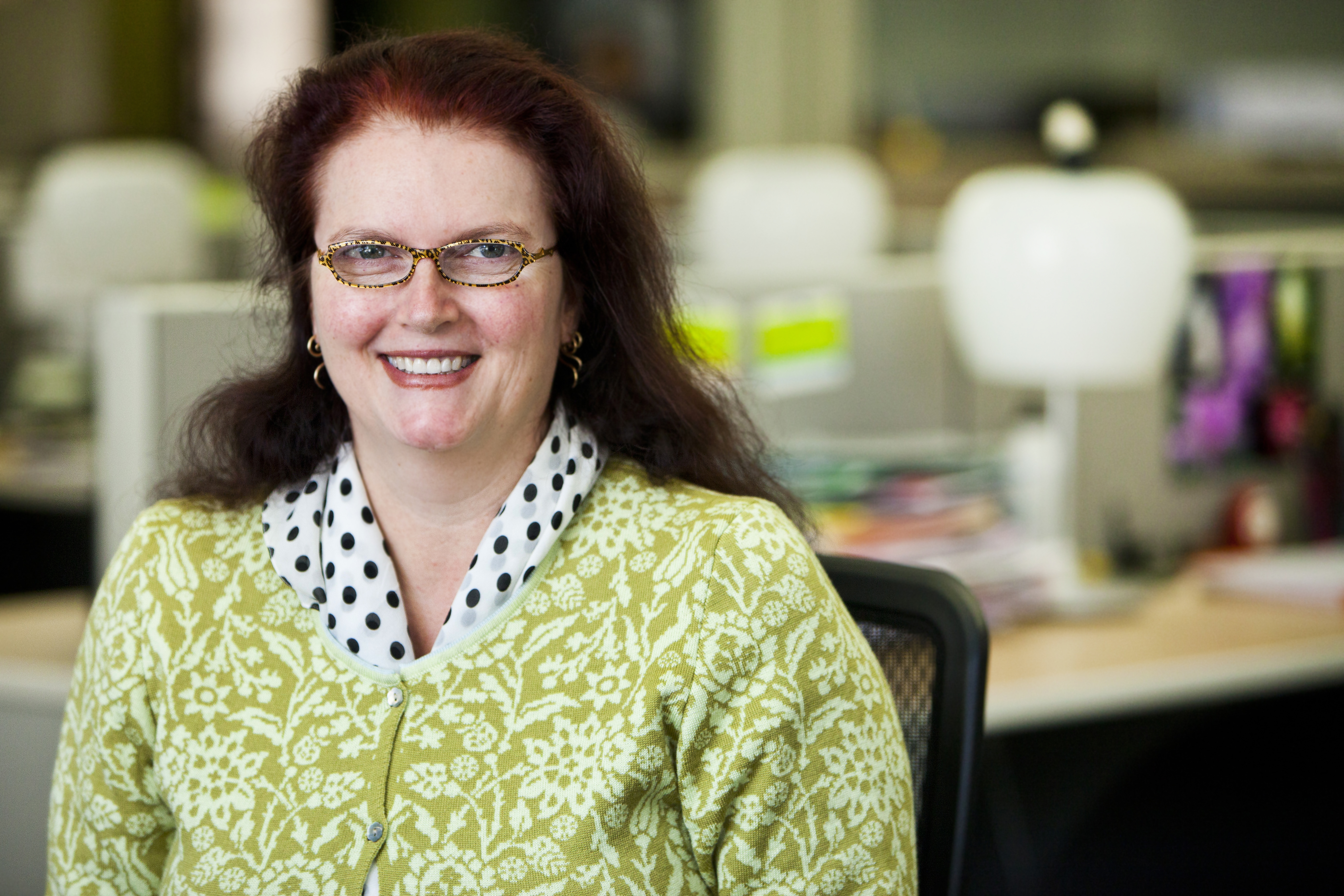
Danese Cooper in 2010

- Hampton Lintorn-Catlin, American computer programmer and programming language inventor who wrote several applications for iOS and other mobile platforms, including a Wikipedia browsing client which was later purchased by the Wikimedia Foundation (WMF). He was later hired by the WMF as its mobile development lead.
- Faizul Latif Chowdhury, Bangladeshi economist and writer who edits Wikipedia (primarily the Bengali-language edition) using his real name
- William Connolley, British climate modeller who edits Wikipedia using his real name
- Danese Cooper, American programmer, computer scientist and advocate of open-source software who worked with the WMF as Chief Technical Officer, In February 2010 Cooper was appointed chief technical officer of the Wikimedia Foundation.
- Lee Daniel Crocker, American programmer best known for rewriting MediaWiki, the content-management software upon which Wikipedia and many other websites run, to address scalability problems

== D ==
- Florence Devouard, French Wikipedian and former Chair of the Board of Trustees of the Wikimedia Foundation
- Mike Dickison, New Zealand's first "Wikipedian-at-large"

== E ==
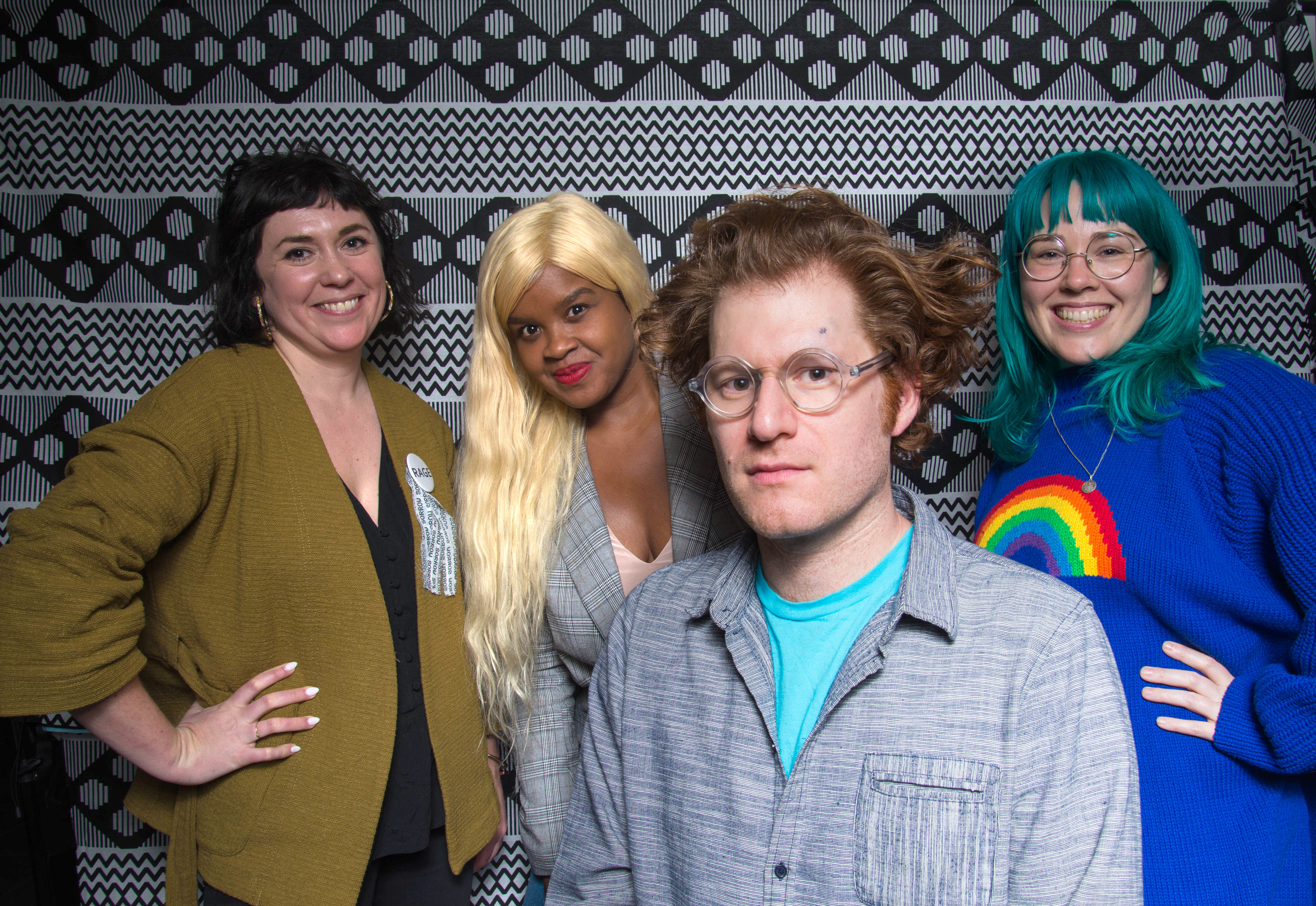
Siân Evans, McKensie Mack, Michael Mandiberg, and Jacqueline Mabey (left to right) of Art+Feminism

- Siân Evans, librarian, activist, and co-founder of Art+Feminism, a global campaign that challenges gender bias on Wikipedia
- David Eppstein, an American computer scientist and mathematician, Eppstein is also a Wikipedia editor on the English Wikipedia

== F ==
- Farhad Fatkullin, linguist known for work on development of Wikipedias in languages of Russia

== G ==
- Gangadhar Bhadani, a prolific Indian Wikipedian (2005–2018)
- Tomasz Ganicz, former president of Wikimedia Polska (2007–2018)
- Sue Gardner, former executive director, Wikimedia Foundation (2007–2014)
- David Gerard, author about cryptocurrencies and Wikipedia editor
- Susan Gerbic, founder and leader of the Guerrilla Skepticism on Wikipedia (GSoW) project
- Mike Godwin, former general counsel for the Wikimedia Foundation (2007–2010)

== H ==
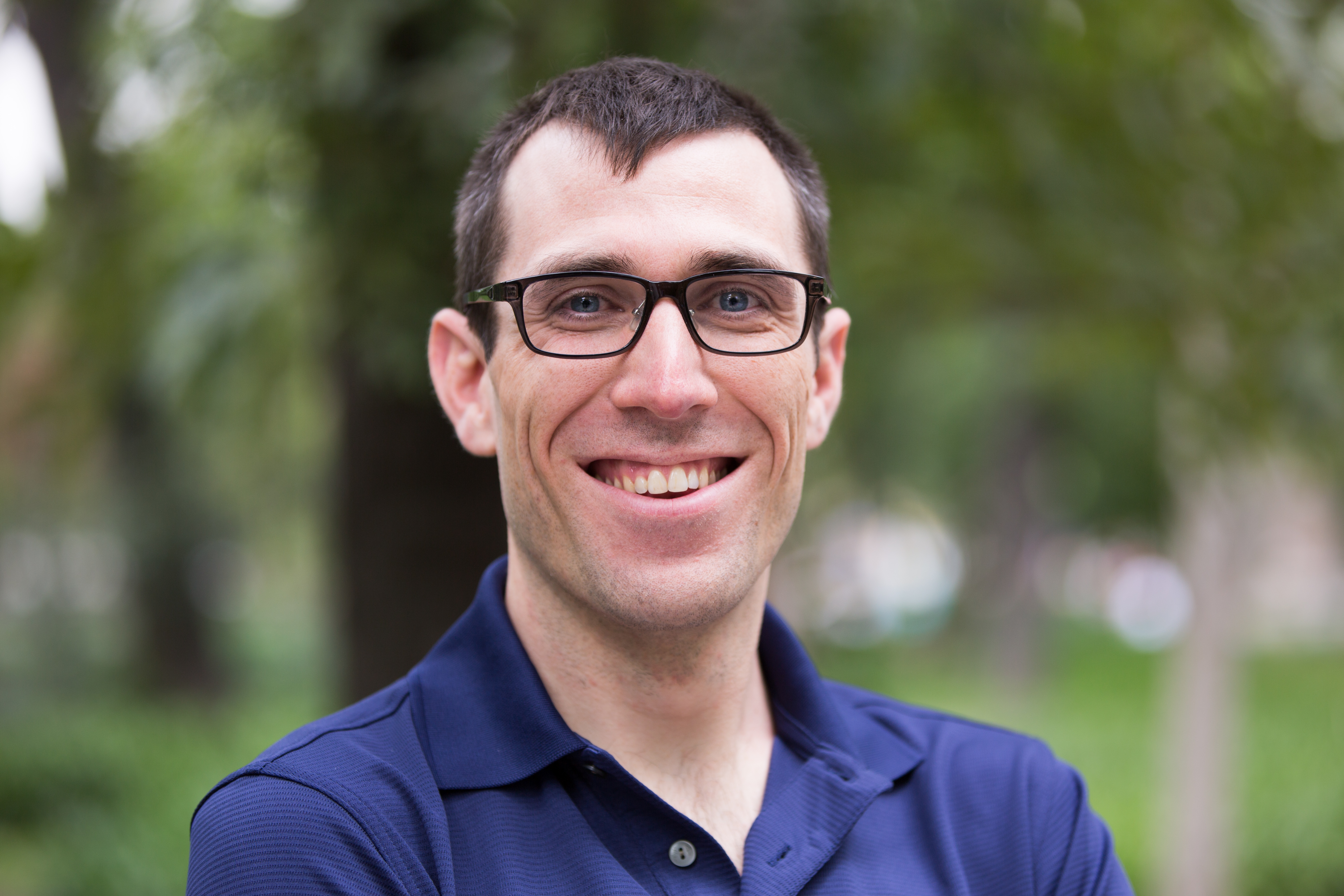
James Heilman in 2015

- Martin Haase, German linguistics professor at the University of Bamberg as well as a linguist, polyglot, and podcaster who is also a Wikipedia volunteer and served as a member of Wikimedia Germany's advisory board (2005–2007)
- Aaron Halfaker, principal applied scientist at Microsoft Research, a former research scientist at the Wikimedia Foundation
- James Heilman, Canadian emergency department physician, and advocate for the improvement of Wikipedia's health-related content
- Miran Hladnik, Slovenian literary historian, specializing in quantitative analysis of Slovene rural stories and in Slovene historical fiction. He publishes his contributions freely on Wikipedia, Wikisource, Wikiversity and Wikibooks, as well as on Academia.edu, Geopedia and YouTube
- Netha Hussain, medical doctor known for her efforts to tackle the spread of misinformation in Wikipedia about the origin of the coronavirus

== I ==
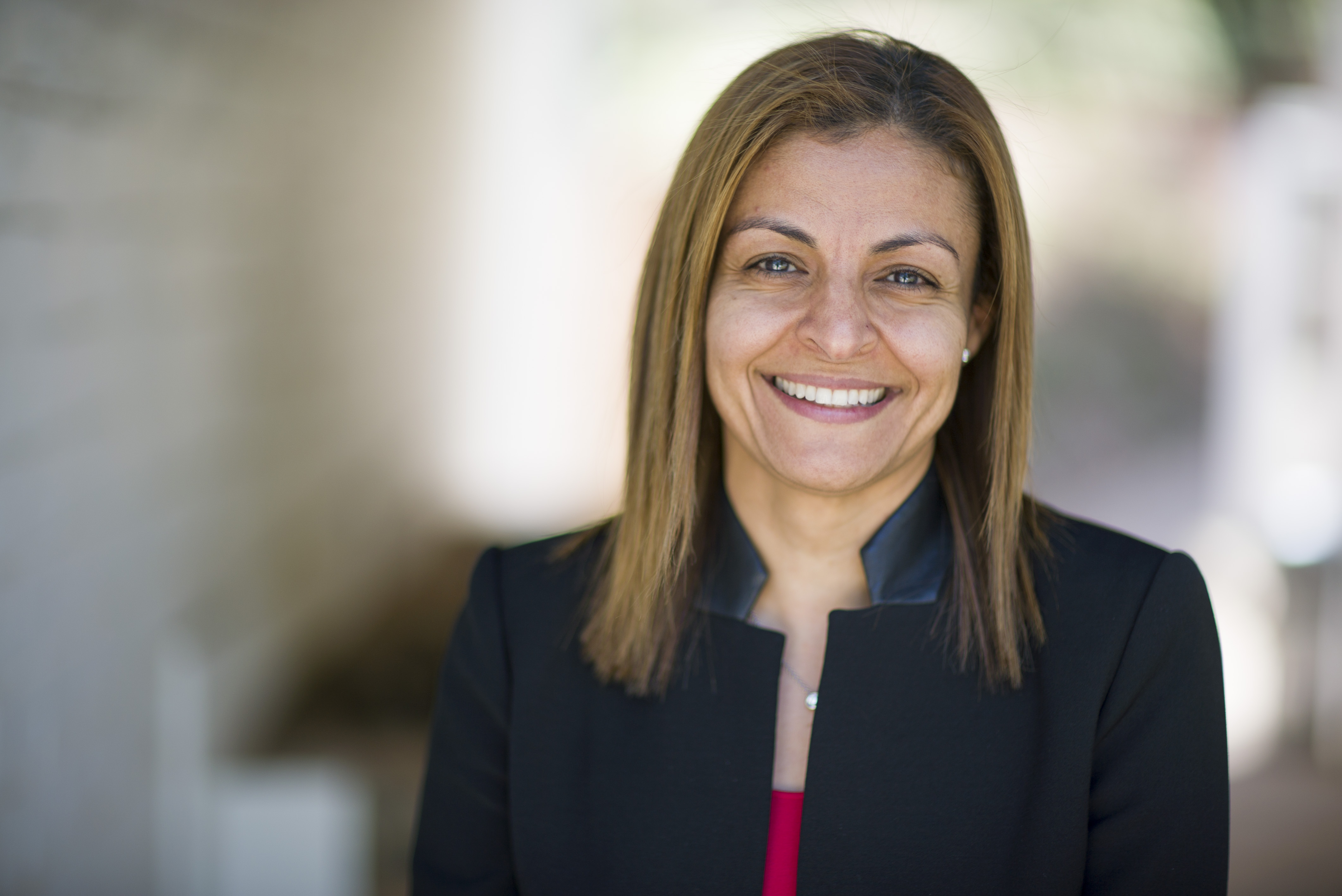
Maryana Iskander, former chief executive officer of the Wikimedia Foundation

- Maryana Iskander, former chief executive officer of the Wikimedia Foundation (2022–2026)

== J ==
- Andrea James, American transgender activist, who was described by the HuffPost as one of "the most prolific contributors in Wikipedia’s history"
- Dariusz Jemielniak, Polish professor of management. Within the Wikimedia movement, Jemielniak is involved in the Polish Wikipedia, where he has served in various roles, including as an administrator, bureaucrat and check-user
- Richard J. Jensen, American professor and historian, longtime Wikipedia editor
- Sverker Johansson, Swedish linguist, physicist, textbook author, and developer of Lsjbot. In 2011, Johannson started making bots on Wikipedia, which have since made millions of edits

== K ==
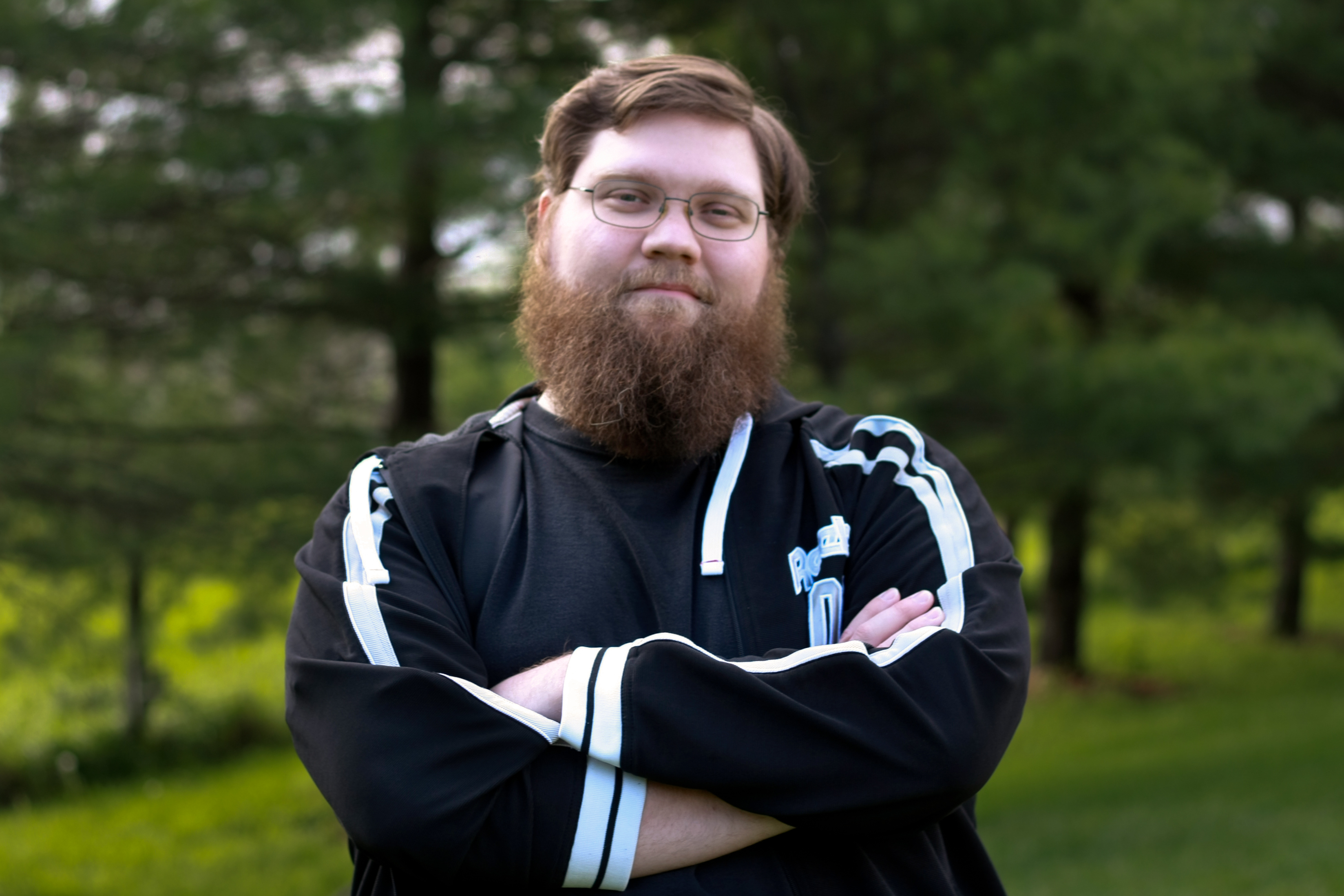
Justin Knapp in 2012

- Uładzimir Katkoŭski (1976–2007), Belarusian blogger, web designer and website creator who was a founder of Belarusian Wikipedia
- Rauan Kenzhekhanuly, Kazakh entrepreneur and NGO activist who was named the first Wikipedian of the Year in August 2011 by Wikipedia co-founder Jimmy Wales at Wikimania
- Osama Khalid, Arabic Wikipedia administrator and medical doctor who was sentenced to 32 years in prison for contributing information critical to the Saudi government
- Bassel Khartabil (1981–2015), Palestinian Syrian open-source software developer who contributed to projects like Creative Commons, Wikipedia, and Mozilla Firefox. On 15 March 2012, the one-year anniversary of the Syrian uprising, he was detained by the Syrian government at Adra Prison in Damascus. Khartabil was executed by the Syrian regime shortly after his disappearance in 2015.
- Kitamura Sae, literary scholar and literary critic in Musashi University. She also edits Wikipedia
- Justin Knapp, American Wikipedian who, in 2012, became the first person to make 1 million Wikipedia edits
- Richard Knipel, Wikimedian-in-residence at New York's Museum of Modern Art, the Guggenheim, the Metropolitan Museum of Art,and the City University of New York.
- Dan Koehl, pioneer and first admin on Swedish Wikipedia and prolific contributor to different Wikimedia projects
- Ihor Kostenko (1991–2014), a Ukrainian journalist, student activist and Wikipedian killed during the Euromaidan events
- Stanislav Kozlovsky, co-founder and last director of Wikimedia RU
- Jonathan Kreiss-Tomkins, American politician and governor-elect of Alaska who made over 13,000 edits from 2005 to 2011

== L ==
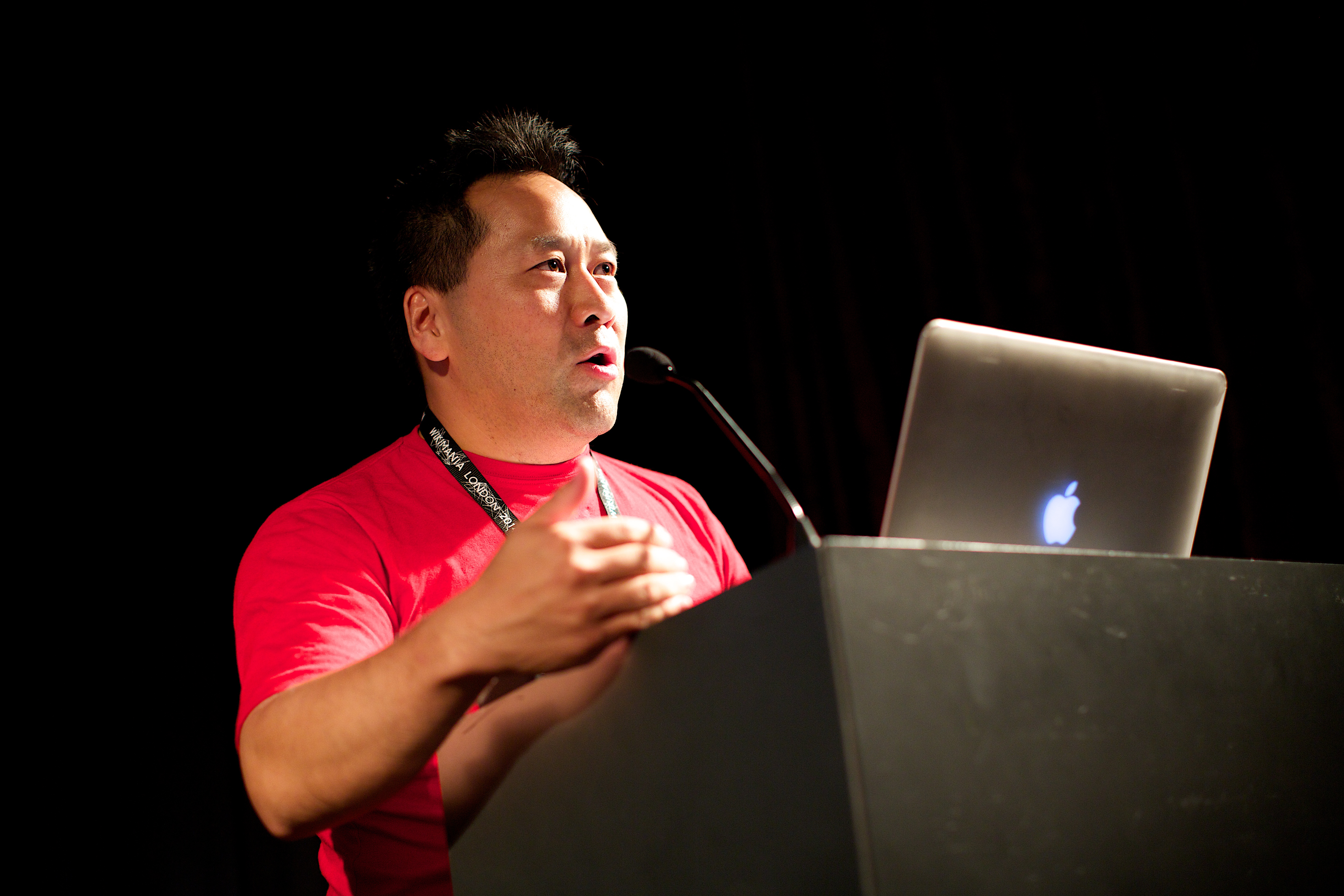
Andrew Lih in 2014

- Nathan Larson (1980–2022), American criminal and advocate that edited Wikipedia before being blocked and banned from the site. He ran multiple sockpuppet accounts with the goal of promoting taboo topics on Wikipedia.
- Siobhan Leachman, New Zealand citizen scientist, open knowledge advocate, and Wikipedian whose work is focused on natural history; Wikimedia Laureate for 2023
- Jennifer 8. Lee, American journalist and founding member of WikiPortraits, a group of photographers working to improve Wikipedia's access to freely-licensed photos of notable people.
- Maksim Lepushenka, Belarusian administrator of the Belarusian Wikipedia who has been imprisoned since May 2025.
- Andrew Lih, American new media researcher, consultant and writer, as well as an authority on internet censorship in the People's Republic of China and a long-time Wikipedian.
- Yuri Lushchai (1982–2024), Ukrainian historian and poet, who died in the Russian invasion of Ukraine. He wrote more than 300 articles in Russian Wikipedia.
- Richard F. Lyon, American inventor, scientist, engineer, and author, one of the two people who independently invented the optical mouse in 1980. He has contributed prolifically to Wikipedia.

== M ==
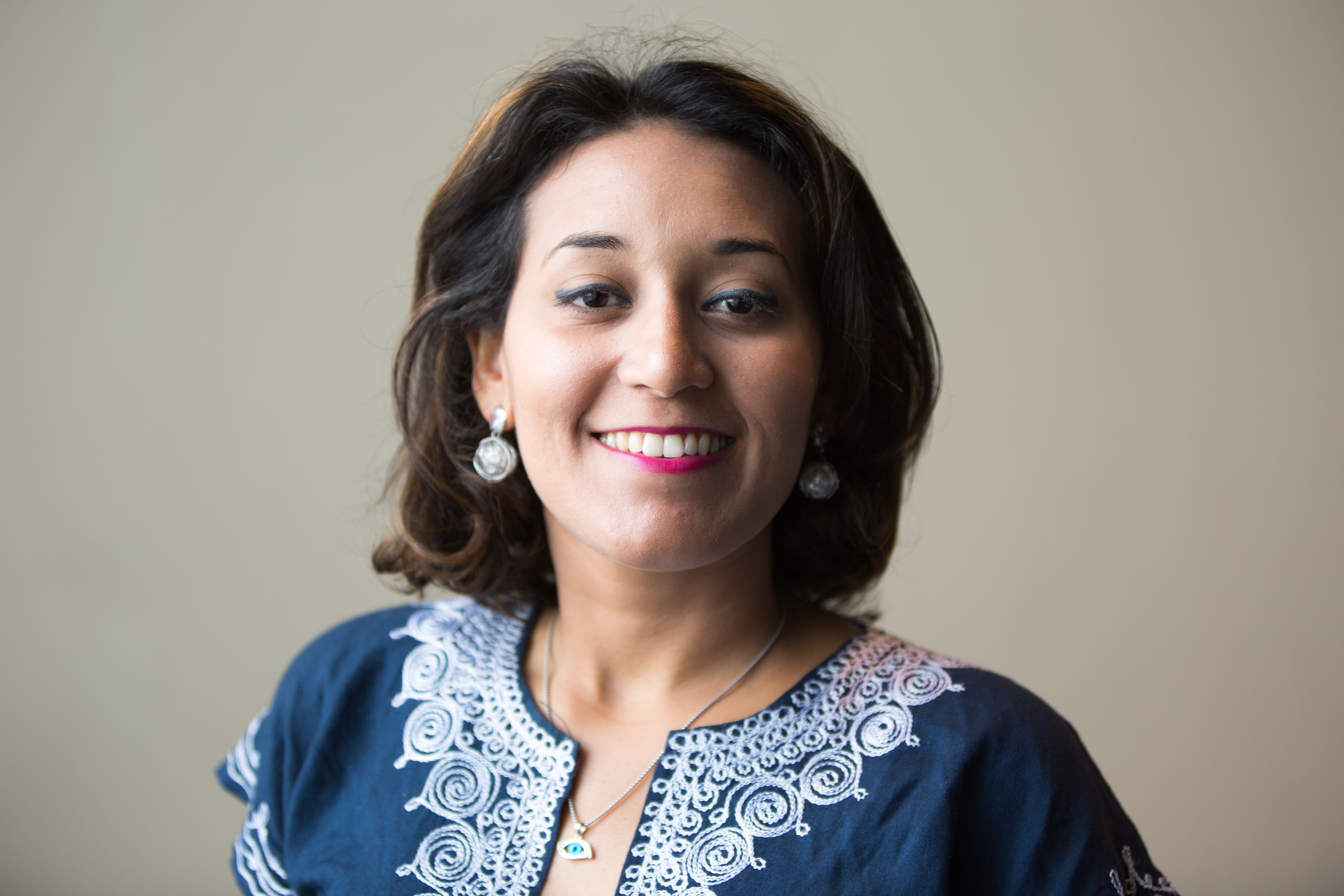
Emna Mizouni in 2015

- Bernadette Meehan, chief executive officer of the Wikimedia Foundation since 2026
- Katherine Maher, executive director of the Wikimedia Foundation (2016–2021)
- Michael Mandiberg, co-founder of the Art+Feminism project. He the creator of the art project Print Wikipedia
- Magnus Manske, developer of MediaWiki and related software tools
- Rémi Mathis, historian, curator, and president of Wikimedia France
- Zachary McDowell, professor of communication, information, and writer of Wikipedia and the Representation of Reality
- Emna Mizouni, Wikimedian of the Year (2019)
- Erik Möller, former deputy director of Wikimedia Foundation (2008–2015)
- Jason Moore, Wikipedia editor and organizer
- Lucy Moore, museum curator known for improving the coverage of women on Wikipedia; UK Wikimedian of the Year (2022)
- Vira Motorko, administrator of Ukrainian Wikipedia, Wikimedian of the Year in the category Functionary of the Year (2024)
- Shabab Mustafa, recipient of Ekushey Padak, the second highest civilian award in Bangladesh, for developing the Avro Keyboard, former President of Wikimedia Bangladesh

== N ==
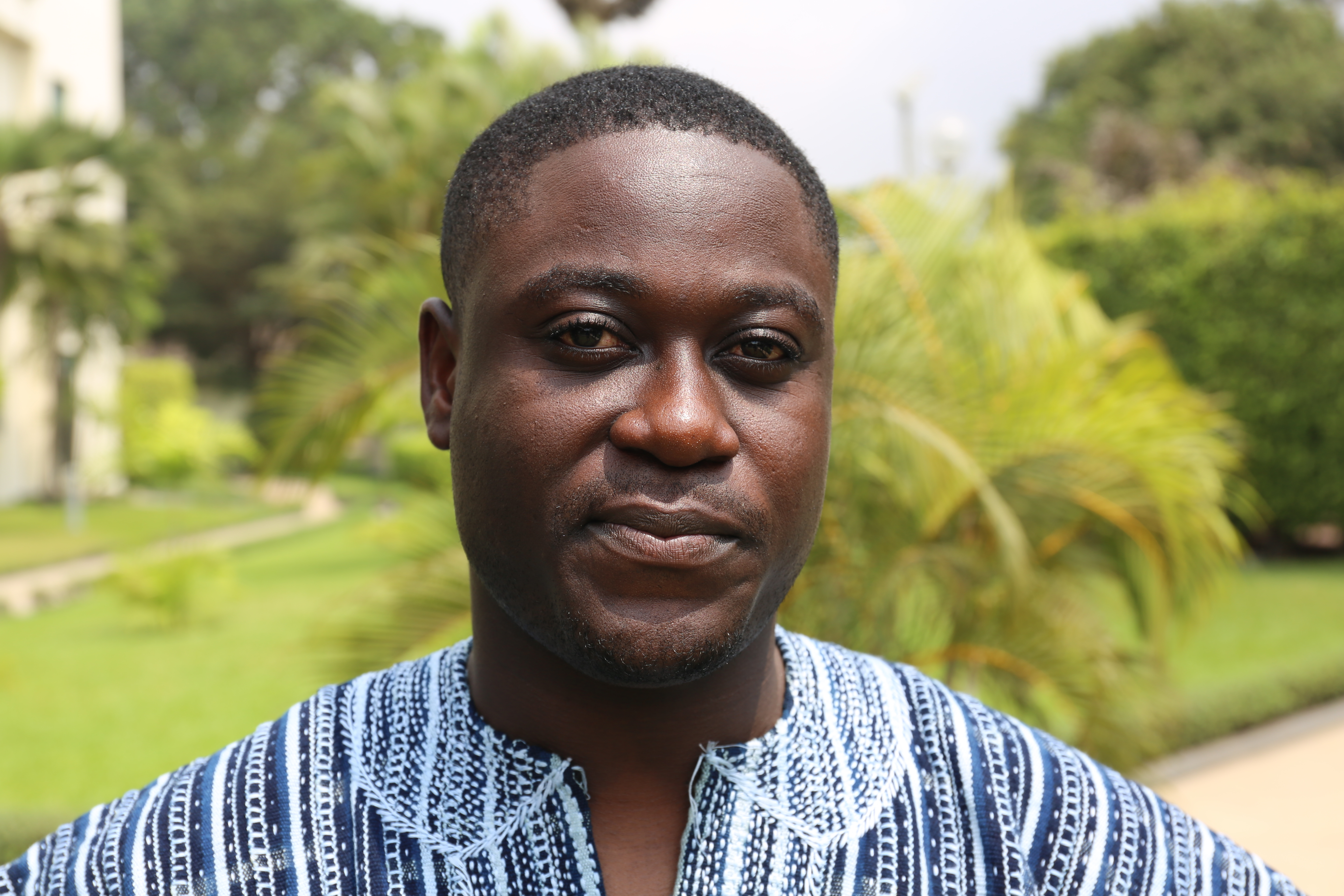
Felix Nartey in 2017

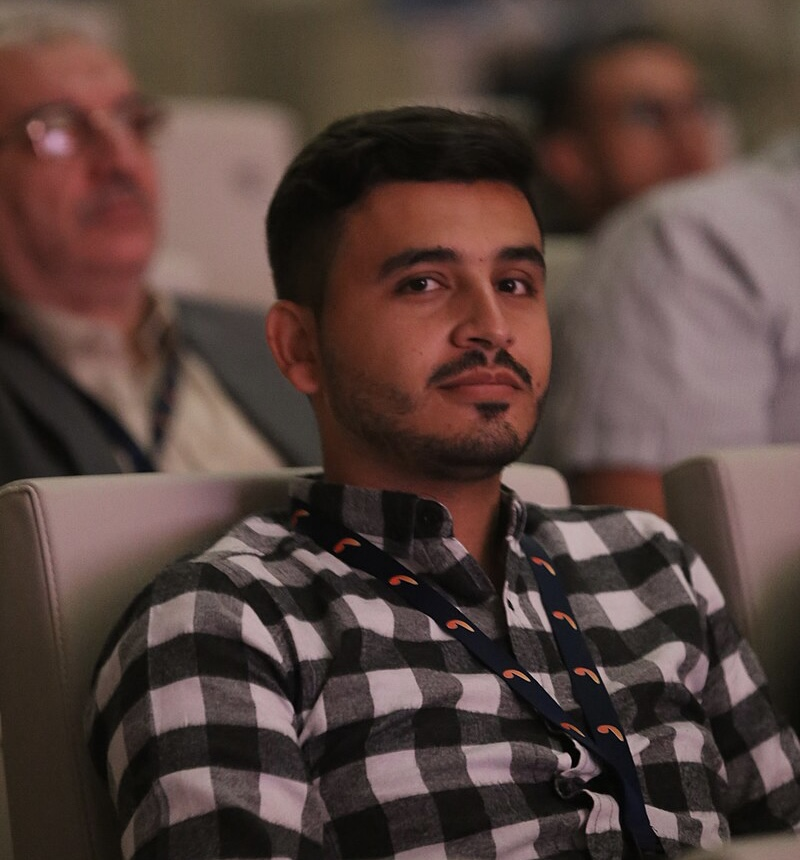
Alaa Najjar in 2022

- Felix Nartey, Ghanaian social entrepreneur and open advocate who was named the Wikimedian of the Year in 2017
- Alaa Najjar, Neurosurgery Resident, Wikipedian and internet activist who was named the Wikimedian of the Year at Wikimania in August 2021 for his pioneering role in the development of the Arab and medical communities, as well as for his role in the development of COVID-19 topics.

== O ==
- Tron Øgrim (1947–2007), Norwegian journalist, author and politician. He was active in Socialist Youth Union (later Red Youth) from 1965 to 1973, and a central figure in the Workers' Communist Party from 1973 to 1984. From 2005 till his death in 2007, he contributed to Wikipedia both online and offline.

== P ==
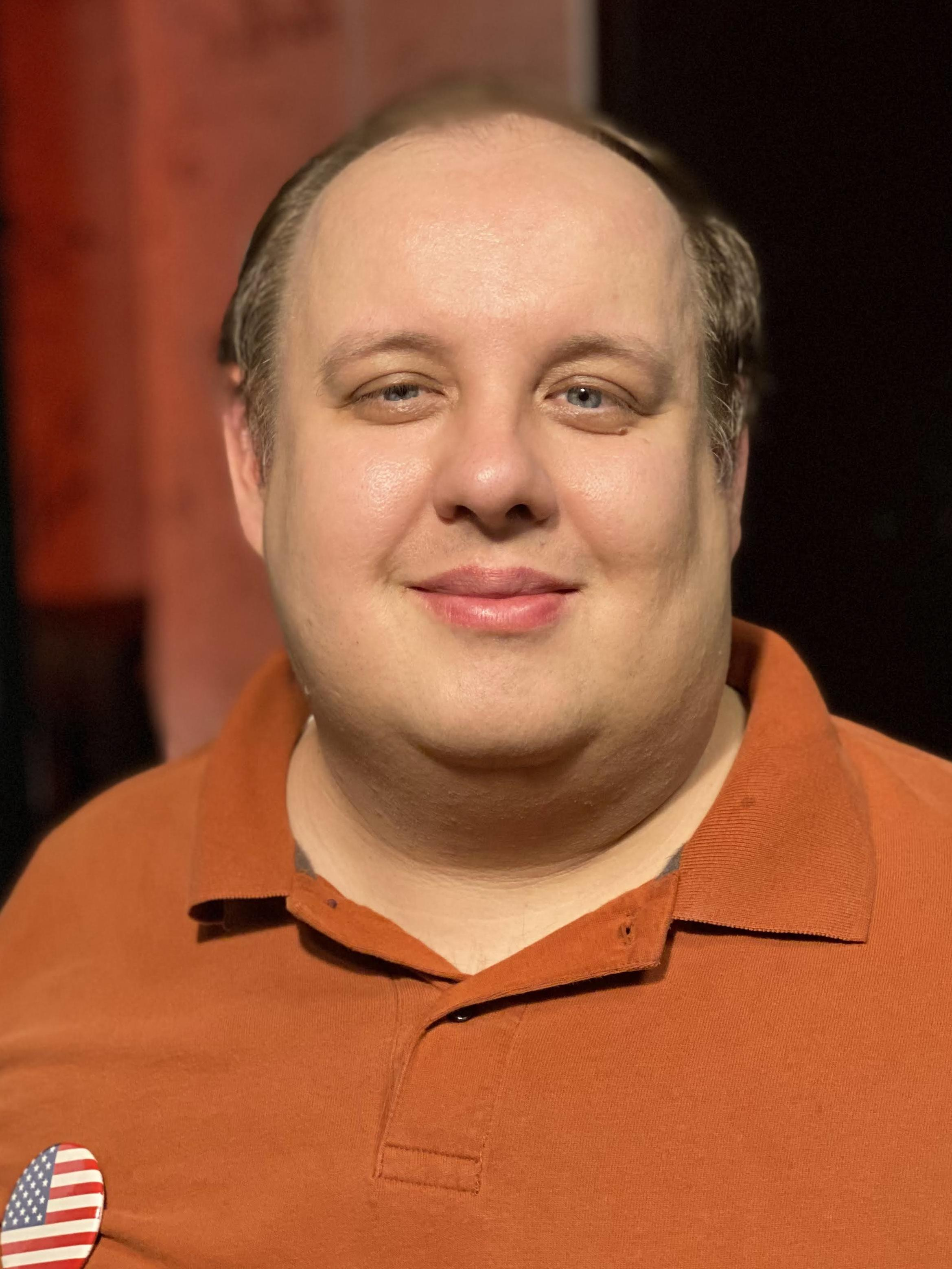
Steven Pruitt in 2022

- Olga Paredes, Wikimedian of the Year (2022)
- Pavel Pernikaŭ, Belarusian Wikipedia editor and human rights activist
- Steven Pruitt, administrator and highest edit count on the English Wikipedia
- Simon Pulsifer, prolific Wikipedia contributor

== R ==
- Karl Rawer (1913–2018), German specialist on radio wave propagation and the ionosphere; edited Wikipedia from 2009–2011 under the username Kmarawer
- Annie Rauwerda, creator of Depths of Wikipedia
- Steven Rubenstein (1962–2012), American anthropologist. He was also a Wikipedia editor and administrator, under the username Slrubenstein

== S ==
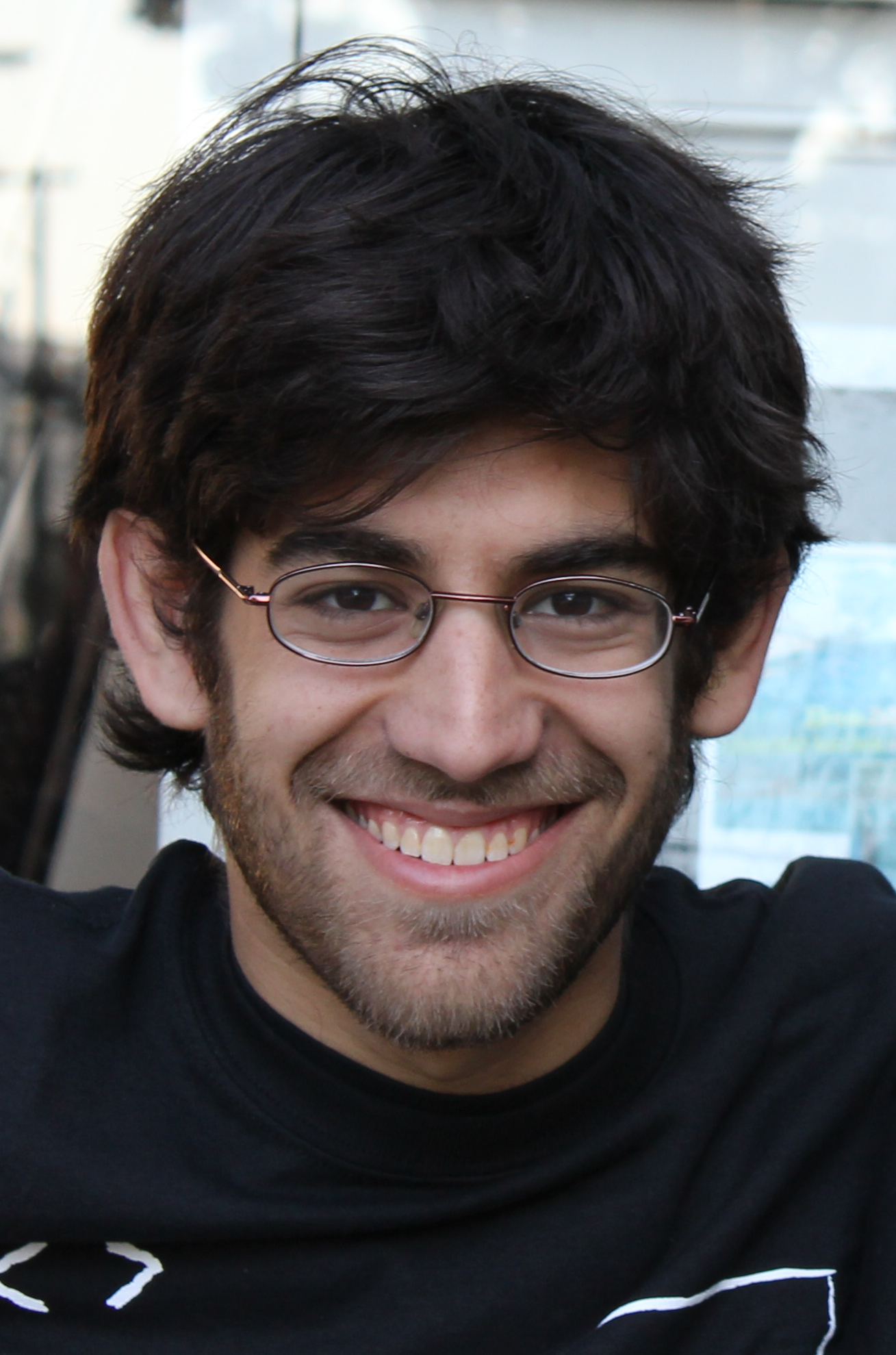
Aaron Swartz

- Larry Sanger, co-founder of Wikipedia
- Tony Santiago, Wikipedia editor recognized in 2007 by the 23rd Senate of Puerto Rico for his contributions to Puerto Rico–related content
- Michael Q. Schmidt (2008–2025) actor, television model, and Wikipedia editor
- Seedfeeder, explicit illustrator on Wikipedia
- María Sefidari, chair of Wikimedia Foundation's Board of Trustees (2018–2021)
- David Shankbone, American photographer and blogger. He used a point-and-shoot camera given to him by his sister in response to a perceived lack of images on Wikipedia, and interviewed Shimon Peres for a Wikinews article
- Chris Sherwin (1962–2017), English scientist and researcher. After his retirement, Sherwin became an editor on Wikipedia, where he wrote nearly fifty articles
- Volha Sitnik, Belarusian activist and administrator of the Belarusian Wikipedia who has been imprisoned on unknown charges since May 2025.
- Gage Skidmore, American photographer photographing American public figures, most commonly politicians and celebrities, which are frequently used in Wikipedia articles
- Revo Soekatno, linguistic researcher and co-founder of Wikimedia Indonesia
- Jan Sokol (1936–2021), a Czech philosopher, university professor and promoter of WMCZ project Senior Citizens Write Wikipedia
- Rosie Stephenson-Goodknight, joint Wikipedian of the Year (2016); Wikimedia Foundation Board of Trustees (2021–2024)
- Boryana Straubel (1983–2021), Bulgarian businesswoman and vice president of human resources for the Wikimedia Foundation in 2015
- Aaron Swartz (1986–2013), American programmer and political activist. Swartz participated in Wikipedia beginning in August 2003 under the username AaronSw.

== T ==
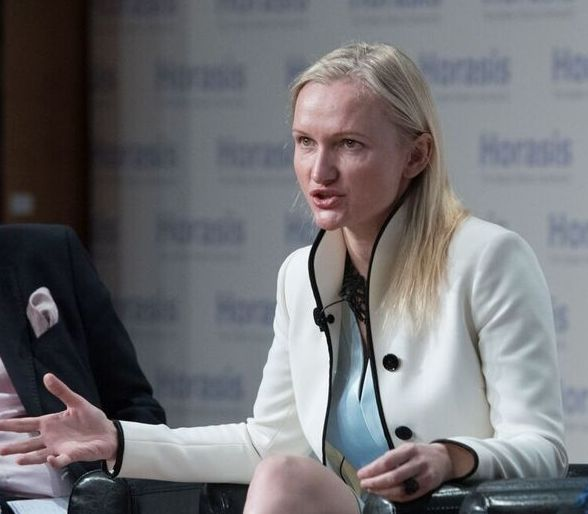
Former Wikimedia Foundation executive director Lila Tretikov

- Sandister Tei, Wikimedian of the Year (2020) and co-founder of Wikimedia Ghana User Group
- Emily Temple-Wood, joint Wikipedian of the Year (2016)
- Boris Tsirelson, mathematician
- Lila Tretikov, former executive director of the Wikimedia Foundation (2014–2016)

== V ==
- Volodymyr Vakulenko (1972–2022), Ukrainian literary figure who was murdered during the Russian invasion of Ukraine. He was also a Wikipedian
- Oscar van Dillen, Wikimedia Foundation Board of Trustees member
- Luis Villa, American attorney and programmer who worked for the Wikimedia Foundation

== W ==
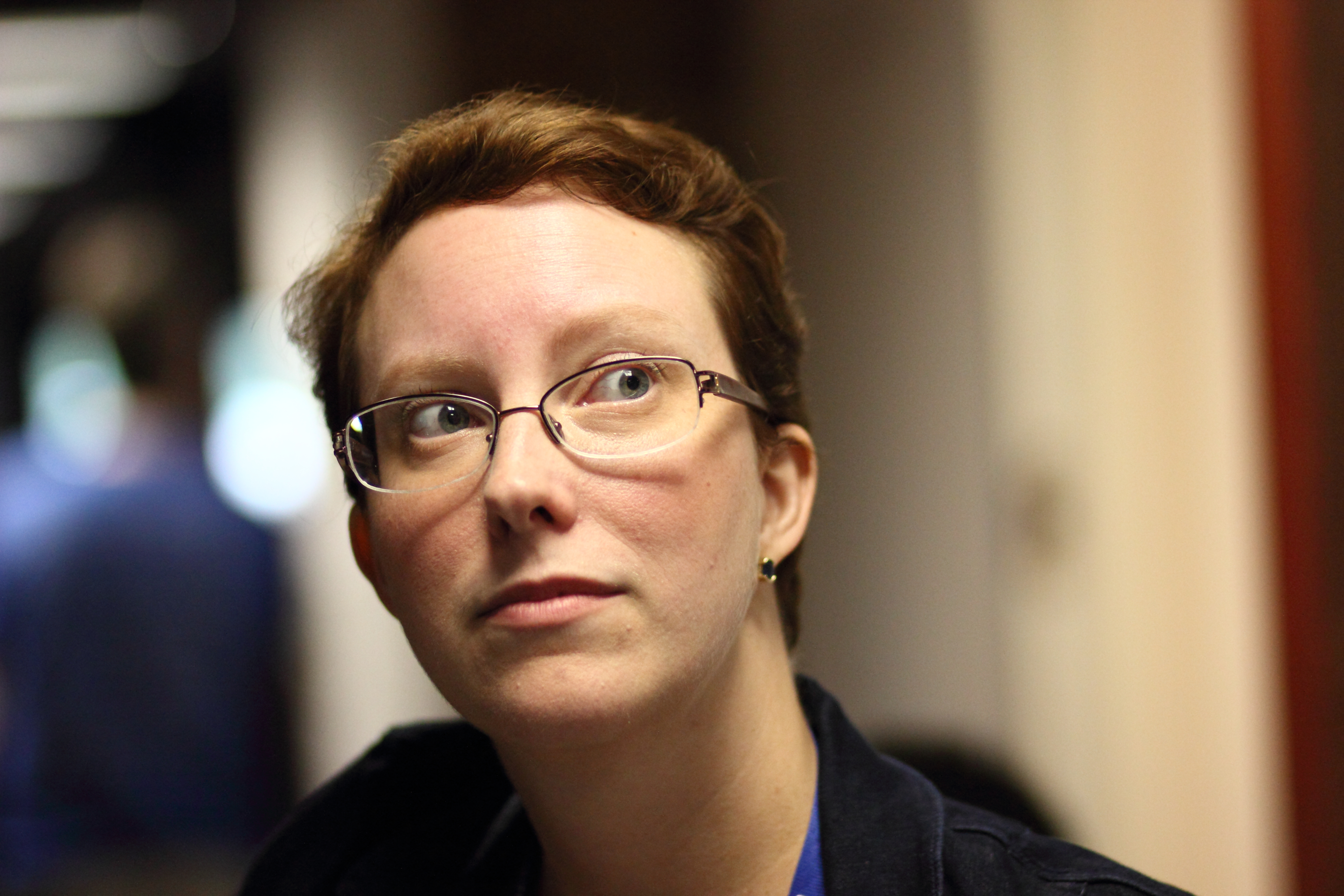
Adrianne Wadewitz in 2012

- Jess Wade, British physicist who has written over 1,700 articles about women in STEM
- Adrianne Wadewitz (1977–2014), American scholar of 18th-century British literature. She was known for making over 49,000 edits to Wikipedia and creating multiple featured articles.
- Jimmy Wales, co-founder of Wikipedia
- Maia Weinstock, American science journalist and gender equality activist. She has been an editor of Wikipedia for a number of years
- Andrew West (linguist) (1960 – 2025), British sinologist, linguist, and script developer. He made tens of thousands of edits to Wikipedia, Wikisource, and Wikimedia Commons in his areas of expertise.
- Winifred O. Whelan, religious sister, academic, writer, and member of Wikiproject Women in Religion
- Molly White, American cryptocurrency skeptic and author of website Web3 Is Going Just Great. She is known for being a prolific Wikipedia editor under the username GorillaWarfare, and she created a request for comment that ultimately resulted in the Wikimedia Foundation no longer accepting donations of cryptocurrency.
- David Woodard, American composer and former Wikipedia editor, known for using over 200 sock puppet accounts to create hundreds of articles about himself in different languages before being discovered

== Y ==
- Taha Yasseri, professor of technology and society at Trinity College Dublin and Technological University Dublin in Ireland. Yasseri has studied the statistical trends of systemic bias at Wikipedia introduced by editing conflicts and their resolution

== See also ==
- List of people imprisoned for editing Wikipedia
