= Blanter =

Blanter (Russian: Бла́нтер) is a Yiddish-language Russian-Jewish surname, literally meaning "someone from one of the places named Blanty" (Бланты).

- Matvey Blanter (1903–1990), Russian composer
- Yaroslav Blanter (born 1967), Russian physicist
