= Mycroft (software) =

Free and open-source voice assistant

- Developer: Mycroft AI team
- Written in: Python
- License: Apache License
- Website: mycroft.ai
- Repository: github.com/MycroftAI/mycroft-core

Mycroft was a free and open-source software virtual assistant that uses a natural language user interface. Its code was formerly copyleft, but is now under a permissive license. It was named after a fictional computer from the 1966 science fiction novel The Moon Is a Harsh Mistress.

Unusual for a voice-controlled assistant, Mycroft did all of its processing locally, not on a cloud server belonging to the vendor. It could access online resources, but it could also function without an internet connection.

In early 2023, Mycroft AI ceased development due to lawsuit by patent troll. A community-driven platform continues with OpenVoiceOS.

== History ==
Inspiration for Mycroft came when Ryan Sipes and Joshua Montgomery were visiting a makerspace in Kansas City, MO, where they came across a simple and basic intelligent virtual assistant project. They were interested in the technology, but did not like its inflexibility. Montgomery believes that the burgeoning industry of intelligent personal assistance poses privacy concerns for users, and has promised that Mycroft will protect privacy through its open source machine learning platform.

Mycroft AI, Inc., has won several awards, including the prestigious Techweek's KC Launch competition in 2016. They were part of the Sprint Accelerator 2016 class in Kansas City and joined 500 Startups Batch 20 in February 2017. The company accepted a strategic investment from Jaguar Land Rover during this same time period. The company had raised more than $2.5 million from institutional investors before they opted to offer shares of the company to the public through StartEngine, an equity crowdfunding platform.

In early 2023, Mycroft AI ceased development.

== Software ==
=== Mycroft voice stack ===
Mycroft provides free software for most parts of the voice stack.

=== Wake Word ===
Mycroft does Wake Word spotting, also called keyword spotting, through its Precise Wake Word engine. Prior to Precise becoming the default Wake Word engine, Mycroft employed PocketSphinx. Instead of being based on phoneme recognition, Precise uses a trained recurrent neural network to distinguish between sounds which are, and which aren't Wake Words.

=== Speech to text ===
Mycroft had partnered with Mozilla's Common Voice Project to leverage their DeepSpeech speech to text software.

=== Intent parsing ===
Mycroft uses an intent parser called Adapt to convert natural language into machine-readable data structures. Adapt undertakes intent parsing by matching specific keywords in an order within an utterance. They also have a parser, Padatious. Padatious, in contrast, uses example-based inference to determine intent.

=== Text to speech ===
For speech synthesis Mycroft uses Mimic, which is based on the Festival Lite speech synthesis system.

=== Modular design and interoperability ===
Mycroft was designed to be modular, so users are able to change its components. For example, espeak can be used instead of Mimic.

== Hardware ==
The Mycroft project had created smart speakers that run its software. All of its hardware is open-source, released under the CERN Open Hardware Licence.

Its first hardware project was the Mark I, targeted primarily at developers. Its production was partially funded through a Kickstarter campaign, which finished successfully. Units started shipping out in April 2016.

Its second hardware project is the Mark II, intended for general usage, not just for developers. Unlike the Mark I, the Mark II would be equipped with a screen, being able to relay information both visually and acoustically. As with the Mark I, the Mark II's production was partially funded through a Kickstarter campaign, which wrapped up in February 2018, hitting almost 8 times its original goal. Mark II shipping started to crowdfunders in the end of 2022. In February 2023, a post on the Kickstarter page announced that they "will not be able to fulfill any remaining Mark II rewards", however they "will still be shipping all orders that are made through the Mycroft website".

== Partnerships ==
Mycroft had undertaken several commercial collaborations. In May 2018, the company partnered with WorkAround, an impact sourcing provider who broker work opportunities for refugees, to undertake bulk machine learning training. In October 2018, Mycroft collaborated with disease surveillance and forecasting company, SickWeather, to identify the frequency of coughing on public transport, funded by the City of Kansas City, Missouri.

== See also ==
- Virtual assistant
- Alexa (virtual assistant and smart home platform by Amazon)
- Google Assistant / Gemini (virtual assistant for Android and Google Nest/Home smart home platform by Google)
- Siri (virtual assistant for iPhone/iPad, Mac OS, and HomePod smart speakers by Apple)
- Bixby (virtual assistant for Samsung mobile phones and smart speakers by Samsung)
- Cortana (virtual assistant for Windows operating systems by Microsoft)
