= María Sefidari =

Spanish specialist in digital culture, chair of Wikimedia Foundation Board (born 1982)

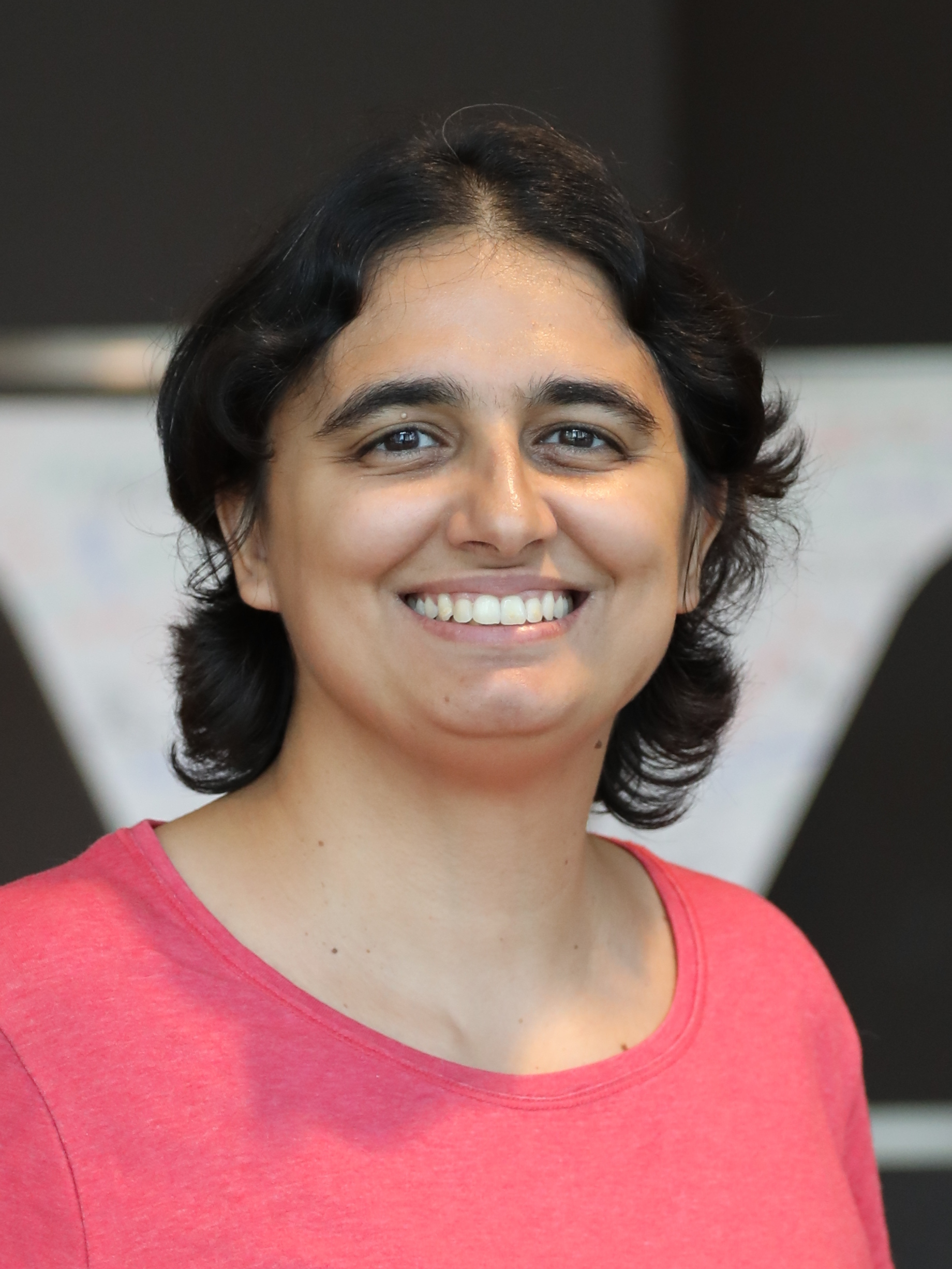
- Sefidari in 2023
- Born: María Sefidari Huici; 1982 (age 43–44); Madrid, Spain
- Education: Complutense University of Madrid
- Title: Chair of the Wikimedia Foundation Board of Trustees
- Board member of: Wikimedia Foundation

María Sefidari Huici (born 1982) is a Wikipedian who was the chair of the Wikimedia Foundation Board of Trustees from July 2018 until June 2021, having been re-elected to the position in August 2019. Sefidari was named a Techweek "Women's Leadership Fellow" in 2014. In 2018, an essay she wrote about the upcoming European copyright reform was widely covered, including by TechCrunch and Boing Boing.

== Wikipedia experience ==
Sefidari discovered Wikipedia when her little sister explained that it was a website that anyone can edit. "Everything begins," she said in an interview with online newspaper elDiario.es, "when you start to get involved in a topic and spend many hours improving articles, and you see that there are Wikipedia policies that should be changed." Shortly afterwards, she launched Wikiproyecto:LGBT to give visibility to these groups and improve and organize all the contents related to this topic, taking inspiration from English Wikipedia's WikiProject LGBT studies. She has also worked to close Spanish Wikipedia's gender bias.

Sefidari is also a founding member of Wikimedia España (WMES), the Spanish chapter of the Wikimedia movement, and she served on its Board as its first vice president.

In 2015, she gave a conference on Wikimedia at King Juan Carlos University on their Digital Communication, Culture and Citizenship program. In 2017–2018, she was in charge of the discipline "Communities in Network: Cooperative creation at the Internet", provided by Wikimedia Spain, as part of a master's degree on communication, culture and digital citizenship, at the same university.

=== Wikimedia Foundation Board ===
In June 2013, Sefidari was elected to the Wikimedia Foundation Board of Trustees by the community of Wikipedia editors. Her term expired in June 2015. In 2016, she was appointed to the Board to fill a vacancy. She was elected to the position of chair in July 2018, a position she held until her resignation from the board in 2021. In March 2020, Sefidari requested a four-month leave from the Board, in preparation for her upcoming maternity, being replaced in the role by Nataliia Tymkiv, as acting vice-chair of the board.

== Professional career ==
Sefidari received a bachelor's degree in psychology and a master's degree in management and tourism from Complutense University of Madrid.
