= Evan Amos =

American stock photographer (born 1983)

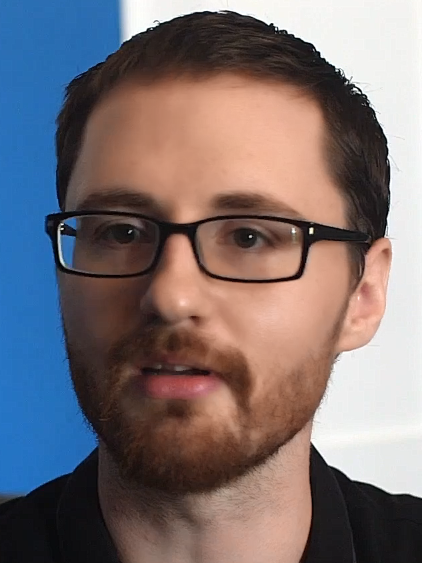
- Amos in 2016
- Born: 1983 (age 42–43)
- Citizenship: American
- Occupation: Photographer
- Years active: 2010–present
- Known for: Freely licensed photos of video game items

Evan Amos (born 1983) is a photographer of video game consoles, which he licenses freely to the public domain. He contributes these images to Wikipedia, and as of 2015 works on The Vanamo Online Game Museum, a free digital archive of video game hardware. As of 2018, he resides in Brooklyn, New York City.

== Work ==
Being "annoyed" at the poor quality of images of video game consoles on Wikipedia, Amos decided to document these systems before they were "forgotten in time". Starting in August 28, 2010, with Nintendo's Wii console, which he happened to own, Amos soon "felt addicted" and started a list of every console. He put an ad on Craigslist and met a collector in Huntington, Long Island, where he photographed various consoles from Sega and Atari. He has expressed "surprise" at the increasing popularity of his freely licensed photos in print, television, Internet, and other media – though he is still rarely credited for them.

After purchasing and photographing video game consoles, Amos donates them to the New York University Game Center and the National Museum of Play, where he is allowed to access them at any time. His library expanded to food items.

In 2013, Amos raised US$17,493 on Kickstarter to expand his hardware collection and build the Vanamo Online Game Museum, for online preservation of the history of video games. It is intended to include an extensive history of each console and its development.

On November 6, 2018, Amos released a book published by No Starch Press, titled The Game Console: A Photographic History from Atari to Xbox, showcasing video game console photos, their hardware, and some history. A second edition was published in 2021.

== Selected works ==
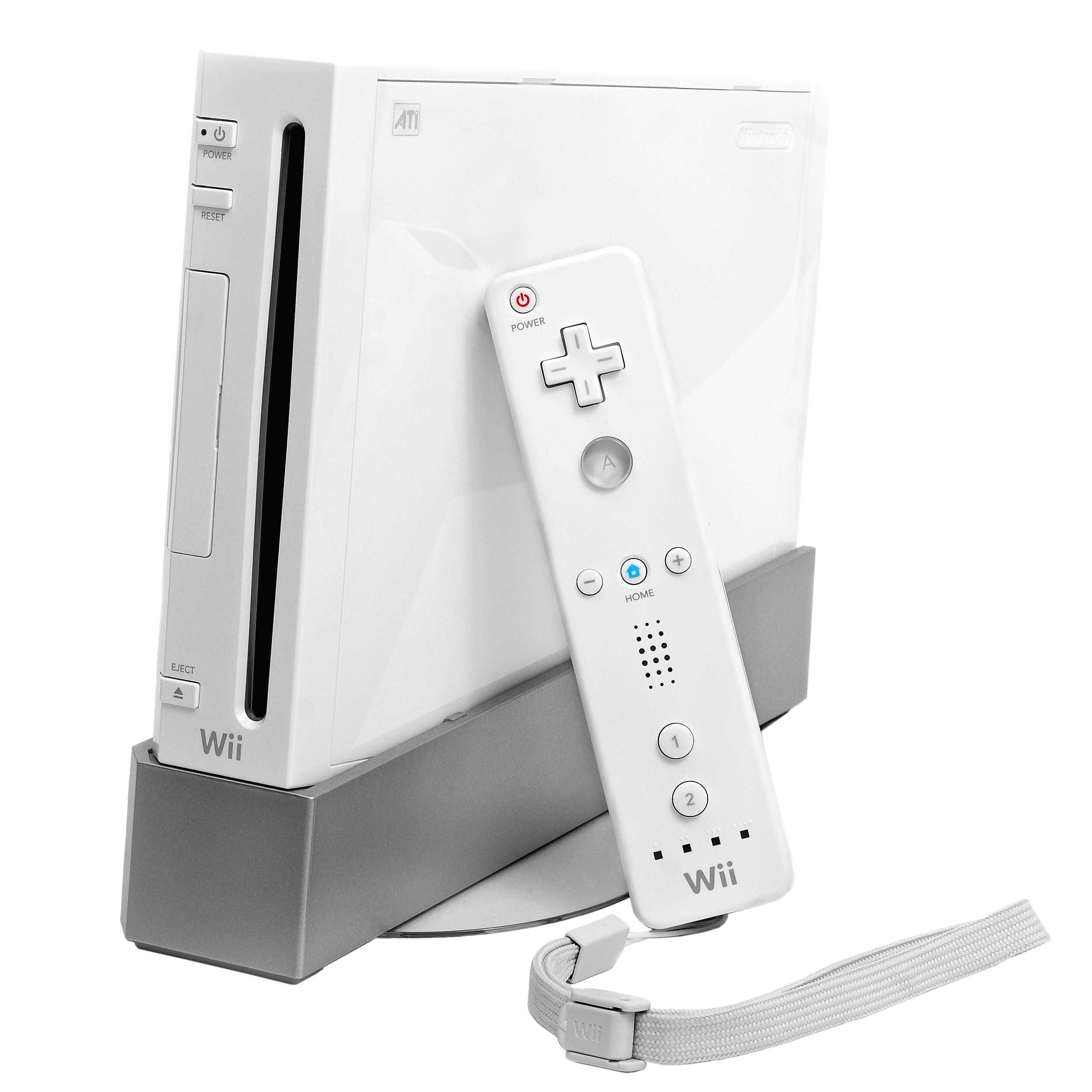
Wii, the first photograph of a game console Amos made for Wikipedia

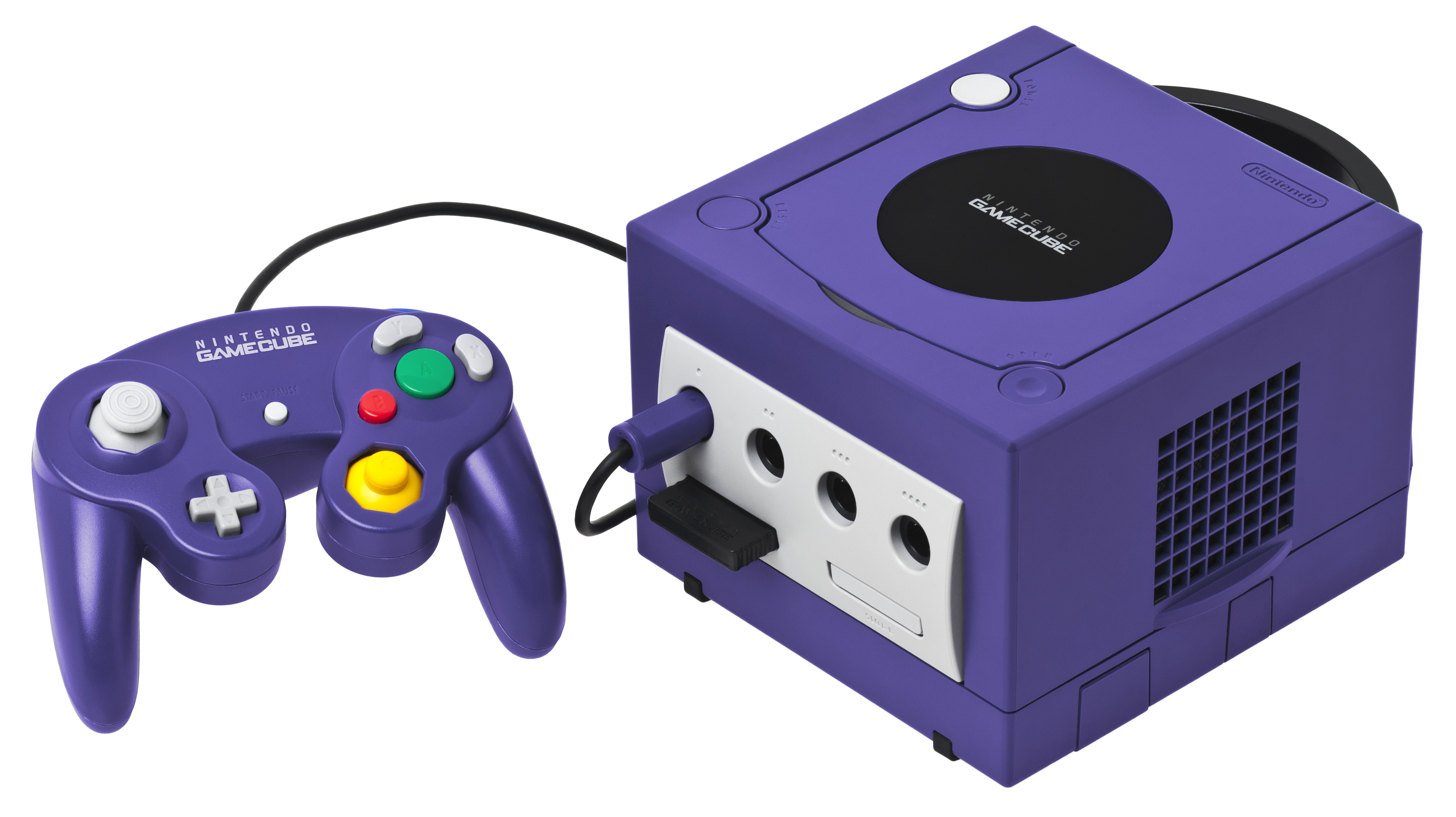
GameCube

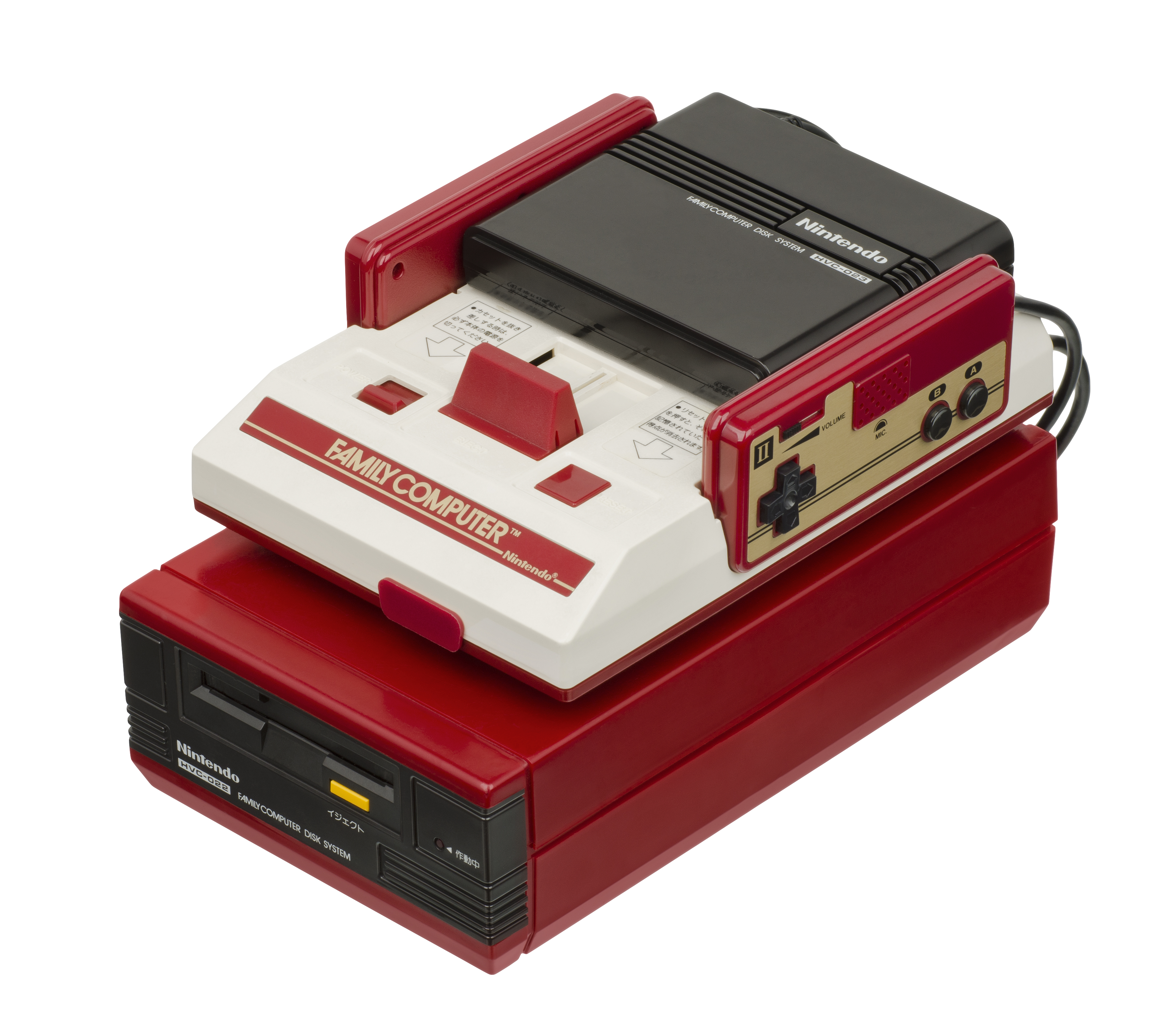
Famicom and Disk System

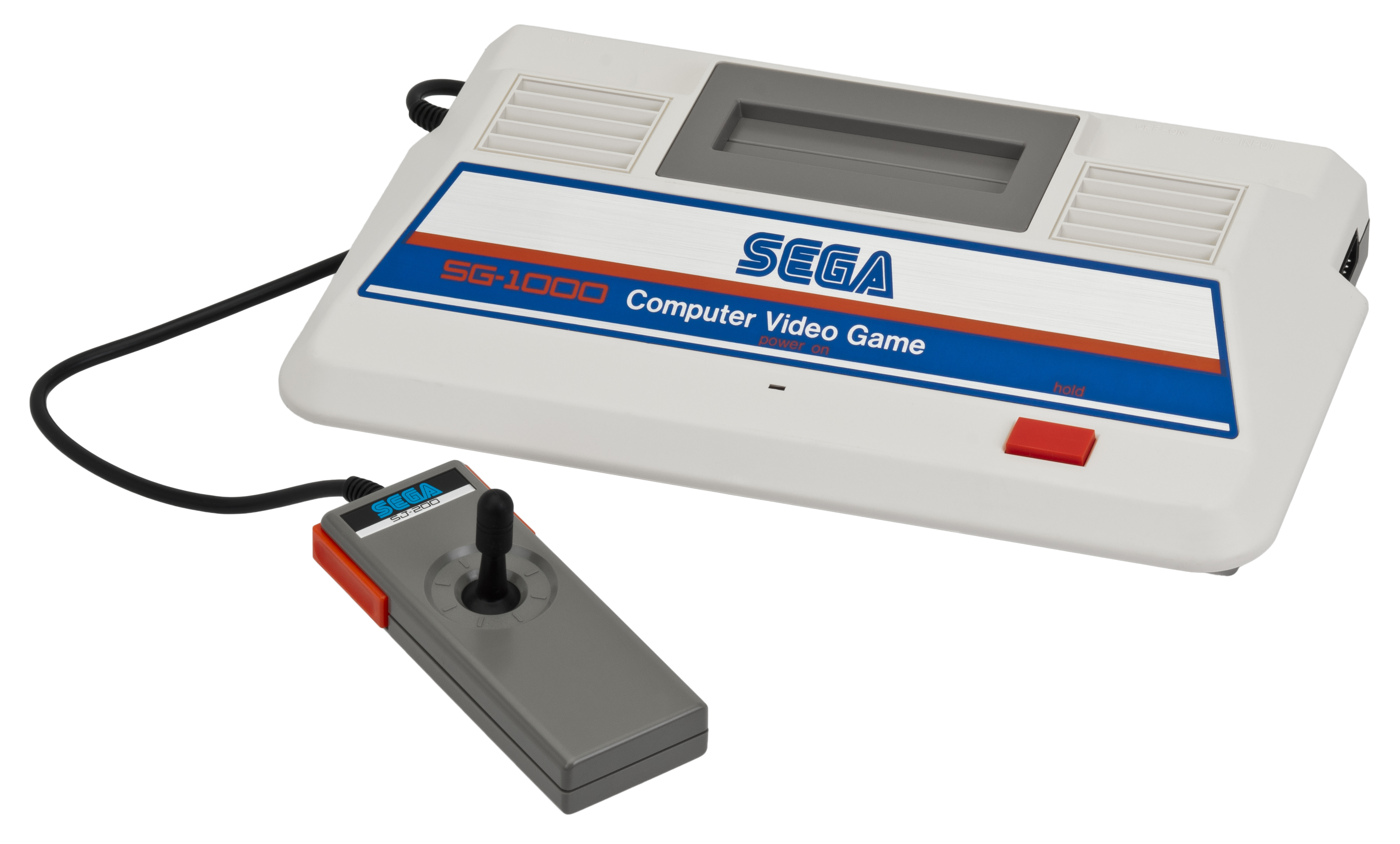
Sega SG-1000

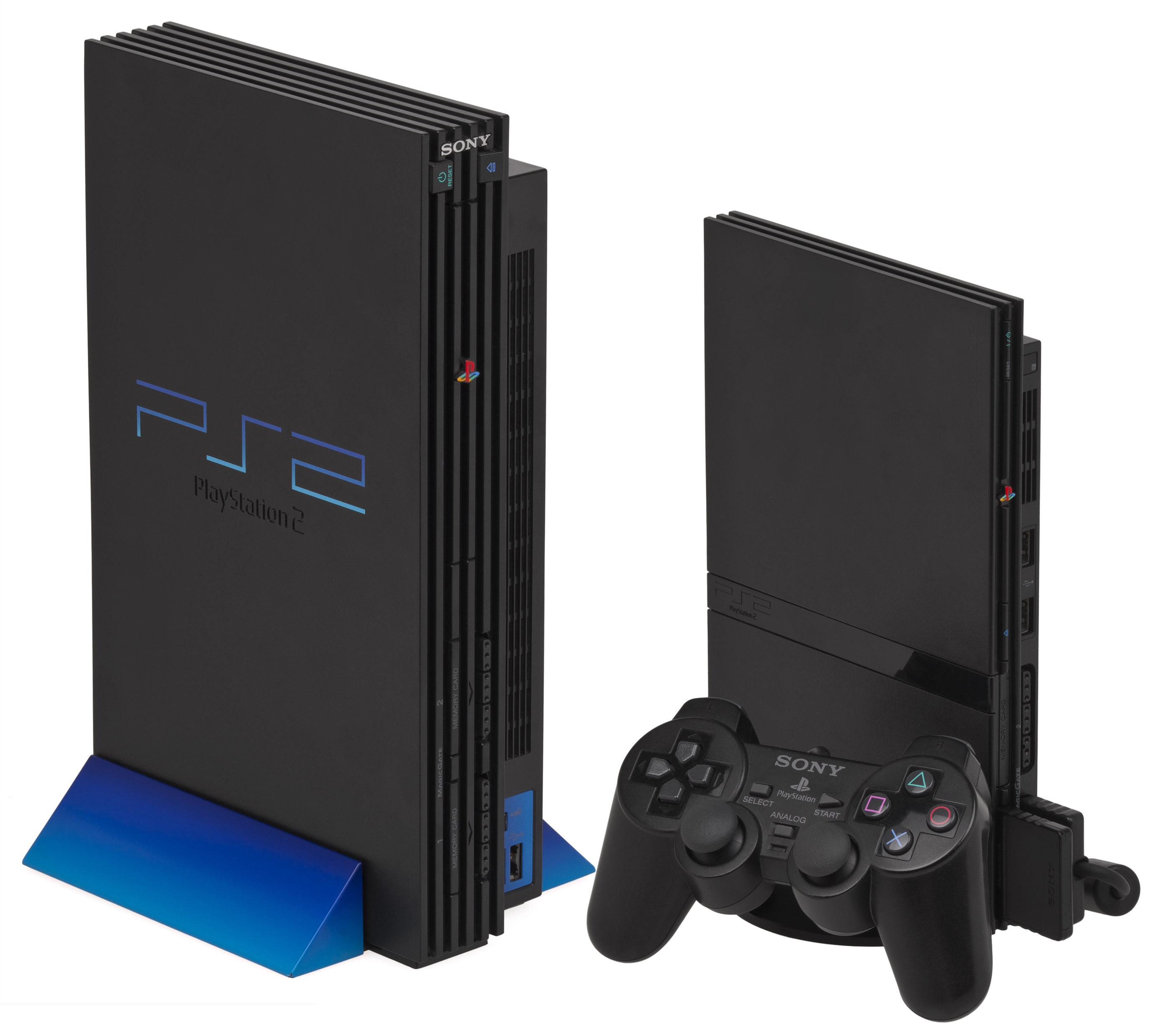
"Fat" and "slimline" PlayStation 2

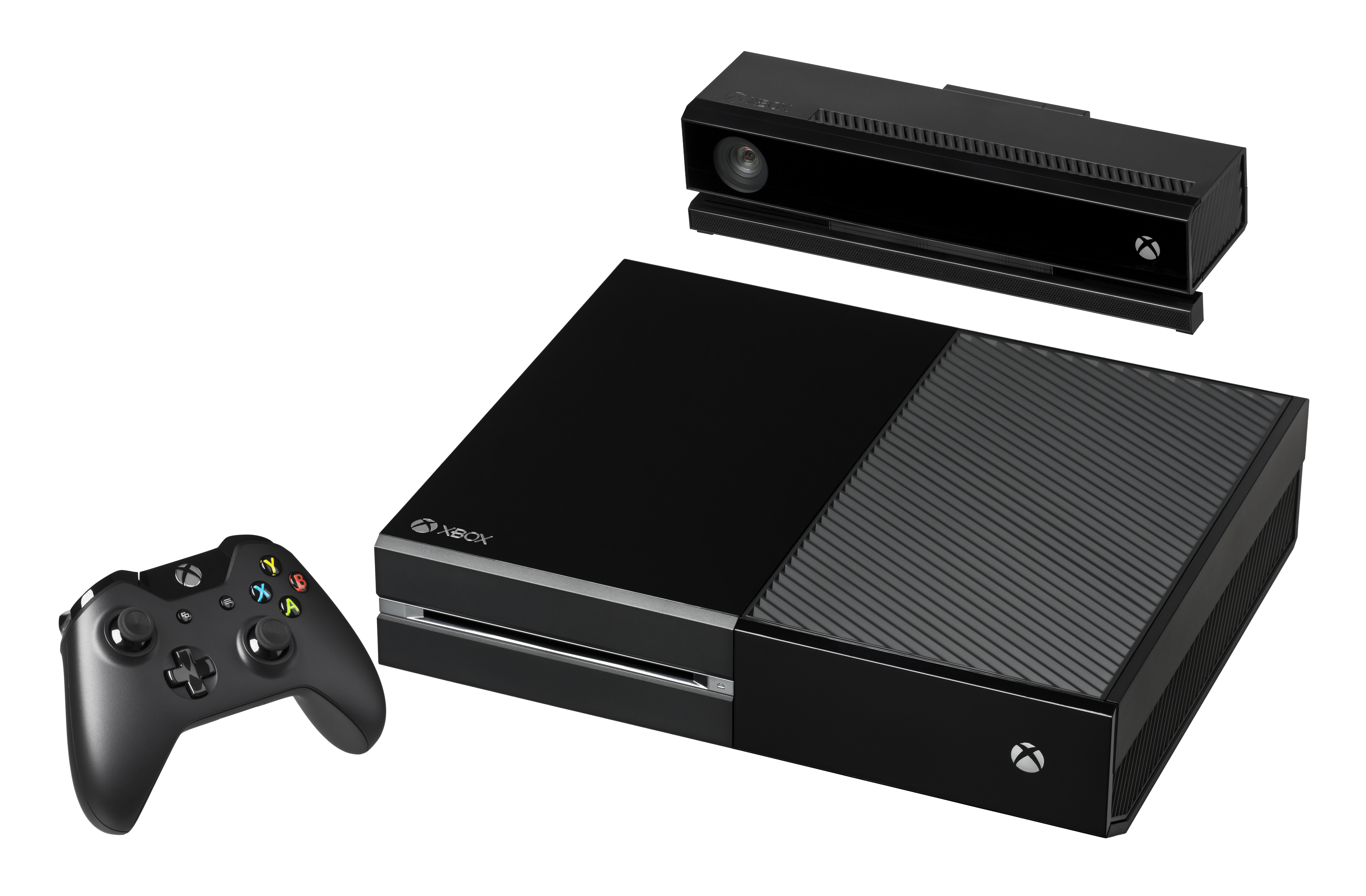
Xbox One

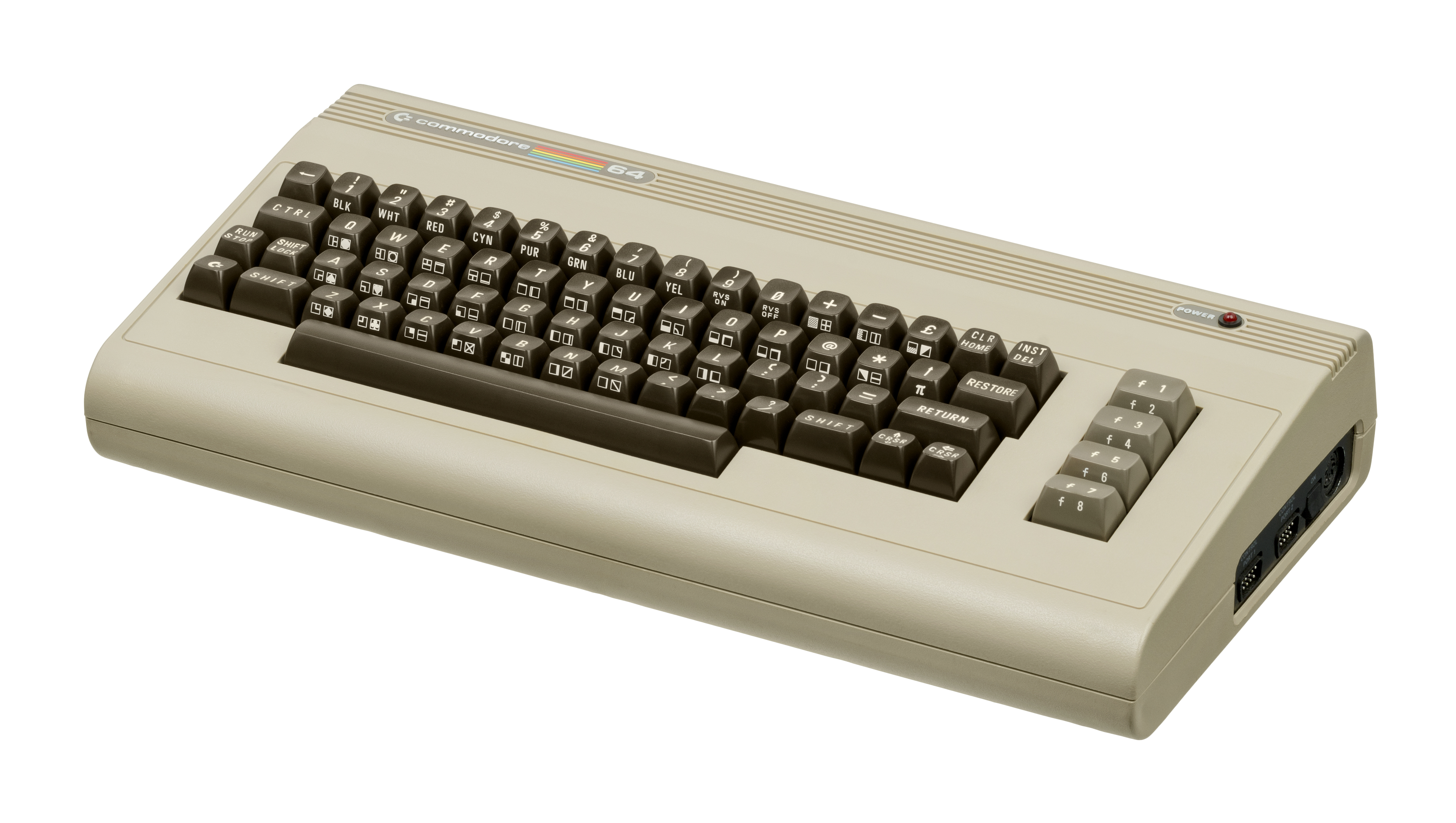
Commodore 64

== Reception ==
Evan Amos and "the Wikipedia Effect"

Destructoid called Amos "gaming's most popular photographer". Popular Science called him "gaming's most famous photographer". Kotaku called The Game Console "an outstanding book for people who like looking at video game consoles".

== See also ==
- List of Wikipedia people
