= Amin Azzam =

American clinical professor in UCSF

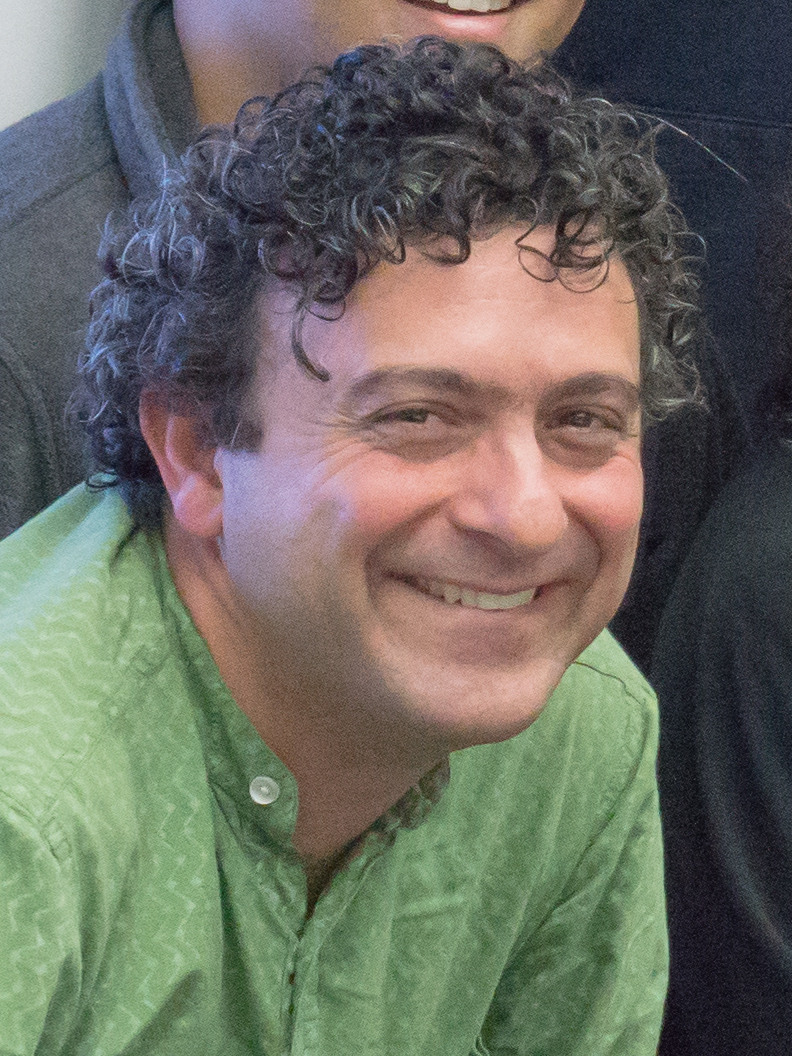
- Azzam in March 2018
- Occupations: Clinical professor; physician; Wikipedian
- Known for: Clinical officer
- Website: profiles.ucsf.edu/amin.azzam

Amin Azzam is an American clinical professor in the department of psychiatry at the University of California School of Medicine. He is also a clinical professor at the University of California, Berkeley, former Associate Director of the UC Berkeley – UCSF Joint Medical Program, and the former Director of the program's "Problem-Based Learning" curriculum, besides being the director of Open Learning Initiatives and Faculty Engagement coordinator at Osmosis by Elsevier. He is known for teaching an elective class for fourth year medical students that consists entirely of editing Wikipedia articles about medical topics. He originally got the idea from one of his students, Michael Turken, in 2012, and was skeptical at first, but later became convinced that it could be a good idea. He then developed the class with Turken. He first taught the monthlong course in December 2013. With regard to the class, he has said, "It is part of our social contract with society, as physicians, to be contributing to Wikipedia and other open-access repositories because that is where the world reads about health information."

== Education ==
Azzam received his undergraduate degree from the University of Rochester and his medical degree from the Medical College of Virginia. He then completed his general adult psychiatry residency at the University of California, San Francisco, followed by a master's degree in education from the University of California, Berkeley.

== See also ==
- List of Wikipedia people
