= Maia Weinstock =

American science writer and Lego enthusiast

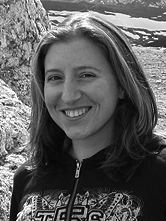
Weinstock in June 2010

Maia Weinstock is an American science writer and Lego enthusiast who resides in Cambridge, Massachusetts. She graduated from Brown University in 1999, and is the Deputy Editor of MIT News.

== Biography ==
Before working at MIT, she worked at BrainPOP, and was an editor for SPACE.com and other science publications.

In 2014, Weinstock was cited by Judith Newman of The New York Times as "a Wikipedian who has been instrumental in raising awareness" of the gender imbalance on that online encyclopedia; her article on how notability is determined on Wikipedia immediately provoked other Wikipedia editors to create a page about Newman.

In addition to her editing work, Weinstock has been an editor of Wikipedia for a number of years, and has been involved in efforts to reduce the gender gap among editors and articles that occur on the site. This work includes working at edit-a-thons on Ada Lovelace Day, as well.

A fan of Lego mini-figures, she first started building them for living scientists, the first being her friend Carolyn Porco. Eventually, this included a submission to the Lego Ideas contest called the "Legal Justice League", which was designed to look like a courtroom built out of Lego bricks, and contained miniature versions of Sandra Day O'Connor, Ruth Bader Ginsburg, Sonia Sotomayor, and Elena Kagan. The submission was declined by LEGO as being too political, which led to an increase in publicity for the project, and eventually led to a submission with generic justices. A Boston Globe reporter described Weinstock's apartment as having "[s]tacks of heads and hairstyles, torsos and legs and arms, a pint-sized Frankenstein's workshop stored in little plastic bins".

In March 2017, Lego announced that it would be making a "Women of NASA" set, based on a design Weinstock had submitted.

In 2022 MIT Press published Weinstock's 320-page biography of Mildred Dresselhaus.

== See also ==
- List of Wikipedia people
