= Adrianne Wadewitz =

American academic and Wikipedian (1977–2014)

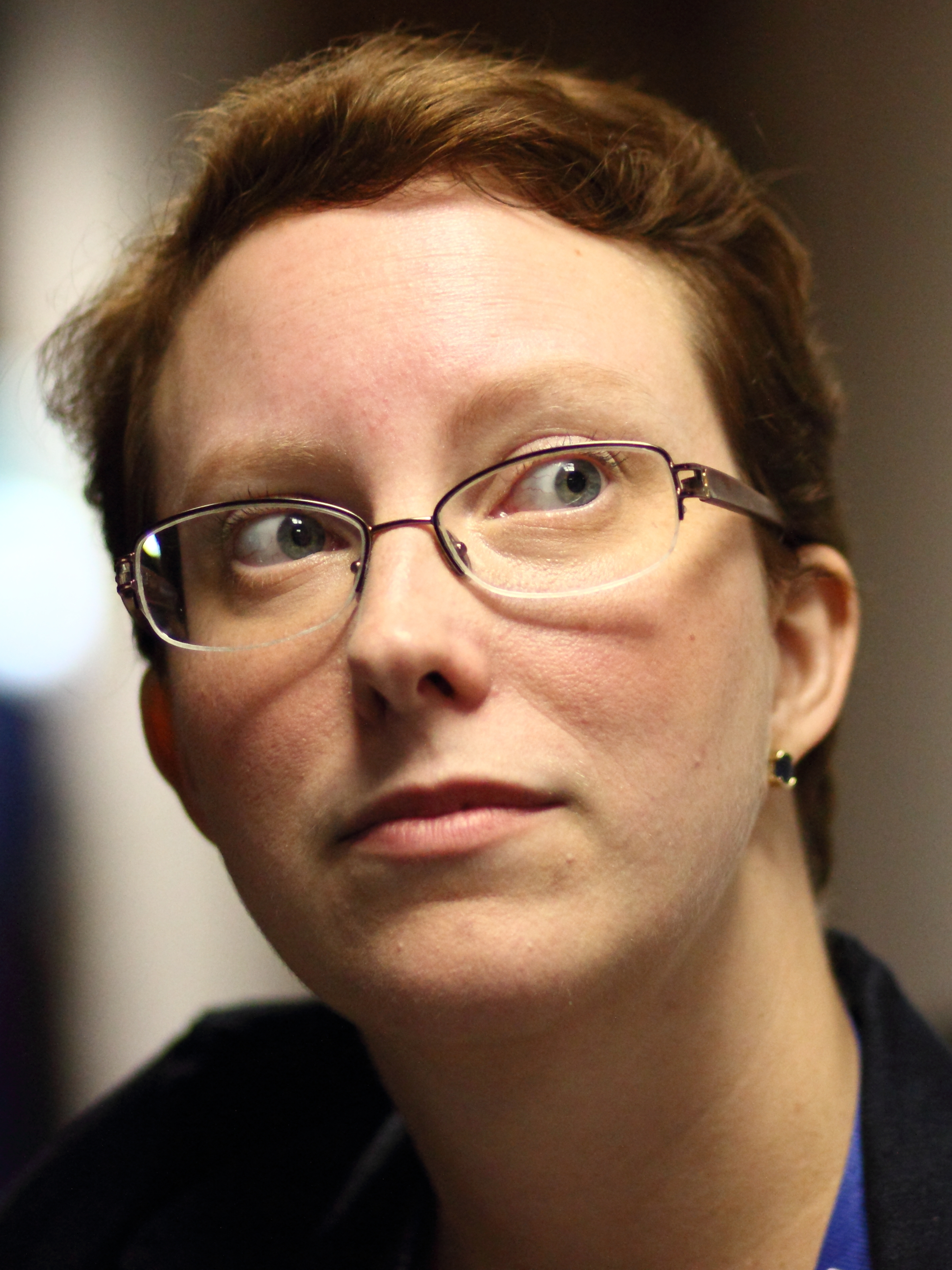
- Wadewitz in 2012
- Born: January 6, 1977; Omaha, Nebraska, U.S.
- Died: April 8, 2014 (aged 37); Palm Springs, California, U.S.
- Education: Columbia University (BA); Indiana University Bloomington (PhD)
- Occupation: Academic
- Known for: Feminist scholar, educator, and Wikipedian

Adrianne Wadewitz (January 6, 1977 – April 8, 2014) was an American feminist scholar of 18th-century British literature, Wikipedian, and commenter upon Wikipedia, particularly focusing on gender issues. In April 2014, Wadewitz died from head injuries from a fall while rock climbing.

== Early life and education ==
The only child of Betty M., a nurse and attorney, and Nathan R. Wadewitz, a Lutheran pastor, Adrianne Wadewitz was born on January 6, 1977, in Omaha, Nebraska. She graduated from North Platte High School in 1995. Wadewitz studied English literature and received a degree in English from Columbia University in 1999. In 2011, she obtained a Ph.D. from Indiana University Bloomington and became a postdoctoral fellow at the Center for Digital Learning and Research at Occidental College. She was chosen as a Mellon Digital Scholarship Postdoctoral Fellow and a HASTAC scholar.

== Academic career ==
Editing Wikipedia featuring Wadewitz as the face of Wikipedia

=== Education ===
Wadewitz graduated magna cum laude from Columbia University, and later received her master's and doctoral degrees in British literature with a minor in 18th-century studies from Indiana University Bloomington. She completed both a master's thesis, Doubting Thomas': The Failure of Religious Appropriation in The Age of Reason (2003), and her doctoral dissertation, 'Spare the Sympathy, Spoil the Child: Sensibility, Selfhood, and the Maturing Reader', 1775–1815 (2011).

Her dissertation combined her research interests in archival work, children's literature, and gender studies. In it, Wadewitz studied the use of language and discursive strategies such as embedded narratives in children's books by Mary Wollstonecraft, Anna Laetitia Barbauld, Charlotte Smith, Maria Edgeworth, and others. She argued that through such reading, the child was supported in the construction of a "sympathetic self" that was "collective, benevolent, and imaginative." She also argued that the kinds of subjectivity displayed in late eighteenth-century children's literature challenged "the dominant Lockean model" by drawing upon "Rousseau's theory of education and the discourse of sensibility to construct a 'sympathetic self.' [...] Significantly, this 'sympathetic self' was available to both sexes and to children. Unlike other versions of the self based on sensibility, it was not predicated upon femininity. Moreover, maturation did not depend on age, but rather on one's state of mind; any person educated through this sympathetic literature could be an adult and participate in civic society through, for example, charitable acts." Moreover, through its analysis of "how childhood reading informed the reading of 'adult' novels by Jane Austen", it argued that "contemporary readers of Austen would have read her novels 'didactically' and followed the structural patterns of the children's literature they grew up reading rather than seeing the irony we value today."

=== Digital humanities ===
In 2009, Wadewitz began putting The New England Primer online, culminating in a permanent online exhibit in 2012, with text and annotated transcriptions.

She published on topics including 18th-century children's literature, ambiguity in historical scholarship, and use of Wikipedia in the classroom.

Writing about the use of Wikipedia in education, she argued that in addition to traditional writing and research skills, students should develop skills in media and technological literacy. Reflecting on the construction of knowledge, she emphasized the need to assess sources; distinguish between fact-based and persuasive writing; and be aware of authority and legitimacy. She promoted the development of curricula that included collaborative writing, development of writing skills in the context of a "community of practice", and writing for a global readership.

== Wikipedia editing and advocacy ==
Wadewitz's video "The Impact of Wikipedia"

Wadewitz made her first edit on Wikipedia in 2004, and went on to create articles on female writers and scholars, several of them becoming featured articles. She originally edited anonymously for several years before revealing her gender. She made nearly 50,000 edits in all.

As a major promoter of getting more women to edit Wikipedia to help end systematic bias, she said, "We need more female editors, more feminists (who can be editors of any gender), and more editors willing to work on content related to women. The single most underrepresented group on Wikipedia is married women of color with children."

She increasingly became seen as an authority on Wikipedia, particularly on the encyclopedia's gender issues, and was cited as such by organizations such as the BBC.

Wadewitz also served on the board of the Wiki Education Foundation.

== Climbing ==
Wadewitz enjoyed rock climbing, which she described in 2013 as enabling "a new narrative about herself beyond that of a bookish, piano-playing Wikipedia contributor":

"For me, one of the most empowering outcomes of my year of climbing has been the new narrative I can tell about myself. I am no longer 'Adrianne: scholar, book lover, pianist, and Wikipedian'. I am now 'Adrianne: scholar, book lover, pianist, Wikipedian, and rock climber'. This was brought home most vividly to me one day when I was climbing outdoors here in Los Angeles and people on the beach were marveling at those of us climbing. Suddenly I realized, I used to be the person saying how crazy or impossible such feats were and now I was the one doing them. I had radically switched subject positions in a way I did not think possible for myself. That, I realized, is what I want my students to experience—that radical switch and growth. It is an enormous goal and I would love to hear how others work at achieving it with their students."

== Death ==
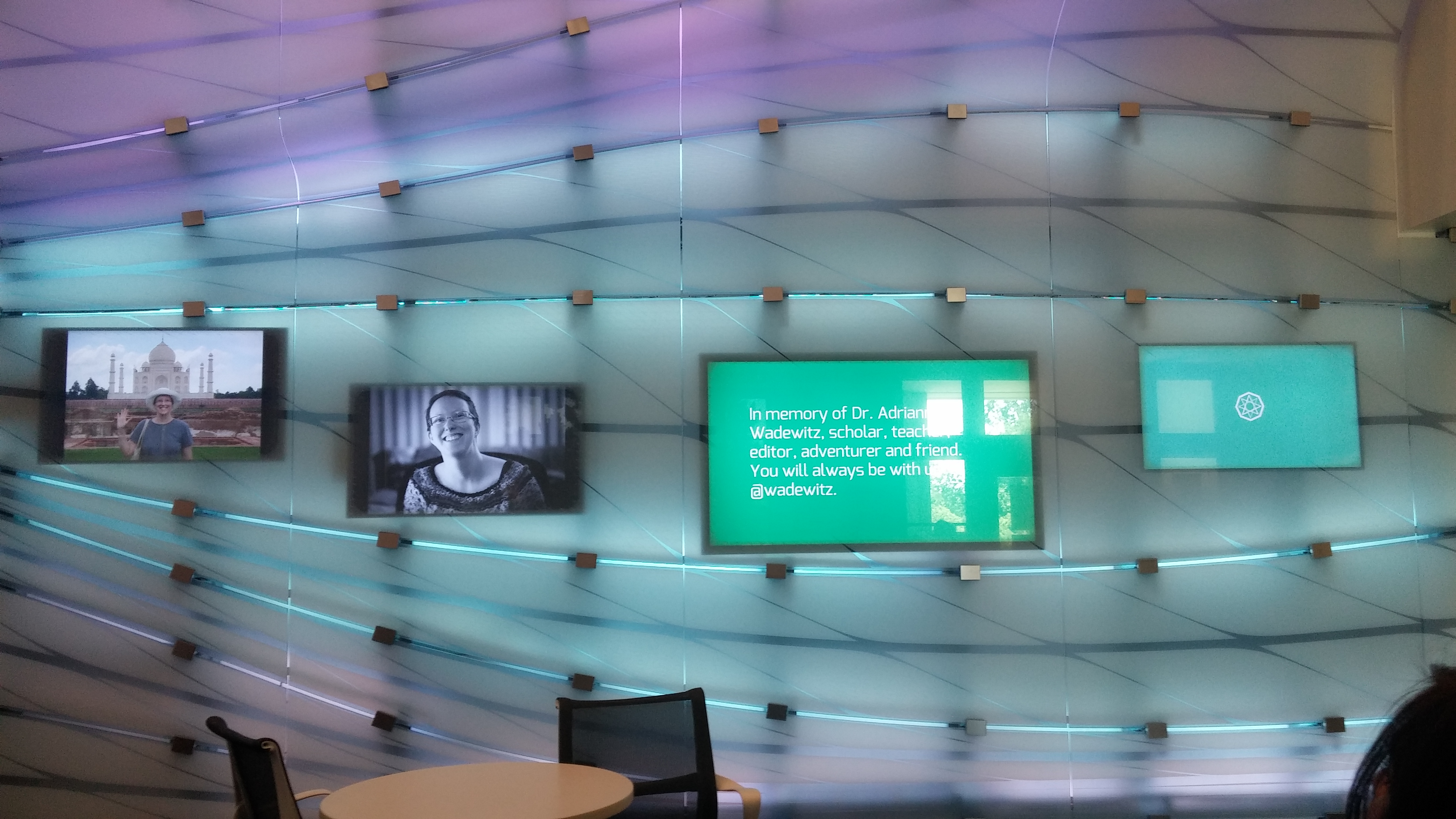
A digital media tribute to Adrianne Wadewitz at Occidental College

On April 8, 2014, Wadewitz died from head injuries sustained a week earlier in a rock climbing fall at Joshua Tree National Park. Sue Gardner, then executive director of the Wikimedia Foundation, described Wadewitz's death as a "huge loss" and said she may have been Wikipedia's "single biggest contributor on ... female authors [and] women's history".

Obituaries for her were published in The New York Times, the Los Angeles Times, The Washington Post, The Sydney Morning Herald, and the Corriere della Sera, amongst others. The Sydney Morning Herald also republished one of her last blog posts, in which she discussed how engaging with a difficult activity had taught her about helping students with their own difficulties, partly by teaching them to celebrate the little successes on the way to a goal. She wrote that, "Ultimately, nothing was more helpful for me than failing repeatedly" and that she wanted her students to realize that failures could be part of learning and were nothing to be ashamed of. The journal ABO: Interactive Journal for Women in the Arts, 1640–1830, which Wadewitz had worked for from 2011 to 2012, dedicated its March 2014 issue to Wadewitz.

== Works ==
- Wadewitz, Adrianne (2003). 'Doubting Thomas' : the failure of religious appropriation in the Age of Reason. Indiana University. OCLC 56926441 – via archive.is. (M.A. dissertation with Hathitrust copy)
- Wadewitz, Adrianne; Gay-White, Pamela (April 2009). "Introduction: "Performing the Didactic"". The Lion and the Unicorn. 33 (2). Project MUSE: v–vii. doi:10.1353/uni.0.0457. S2CID 144967267.
- Wadewitz, Adrianne (2011). 'Spare the Sympathy, Spoil the Child:' Sensibility, Selfhood, and the Maturing Reader, 1775–1815 (Ph.D.). Ann Arbor, Michigan: Indiana University. ProQuest 884792113. Order Number 3466388.
- Wadewitz, Adrianne; Geller, Anne Ellen; Beasley-Murray, Jon (2013). "Wiki-hacking: Opening up the Academy with Wikipedia". In Scheinfeldt, Tom; Cohen, Daniel J. (eds.). Hacking the Academy: New Approaches to Scholarship and Teaching from Digital Humanities. Ann Arbor, Michigan: University of Michigan Press. Archived from the original on April 24, 2014.
- Wadewitz, Adrianne; Hilson, Mica (January 2014). "A Doctor for Who(m)?: Queer Temporalities and the Sexualized Child". Bookbird: A Journal of International Children's Literature. 52 (1). Project MUSE: 63–76. doi:10.1353/bkb.2014.0036. S2CID 143967856.

== See also ==
- Gender bias on Wikipedia
- List of Wikipedia people
