= Yuri Lushchai =

Ukrainian historian and Wikipedian (1982–2024)

- Юрій Лущай
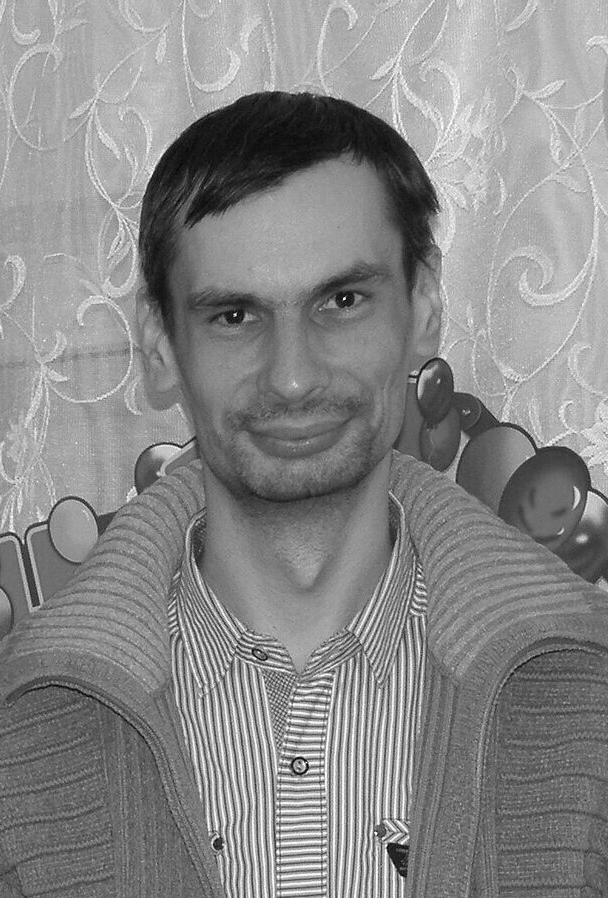
- Lushchai in 2016
- Born: Yuri Volodomyrovich Lushchai; 10 February 1982; Kramatorsk, Donetsk Oblast, Ukrainian SSR, Soviet Union
- Died: March 28, 2024 (aged 42); Ivanivske, Donetsk Oblast, Russian-occupied Ukraine
- Cause of death: War
- Body discovered: Ivanivske, Donetsk Oblast
- Burial place: Mukachevo Raion, Zakarpattia Oblast
- Occupations: Wikipedian; historian; poet
- Years active: 2009–2020
- Known for: Contributing to Wikipedia

Yuriy Volodomyrovych Lushchai (Ukrainian: Юрій Володимирович Лущай, pronounced [ˈjur⁽ʲ⁾ij woloˈdɪmɪrowɪtʃ lʊˈʃtʃɑj]; Russian: Юрий Владимирович Лущай, romanized: Yuriy Vladimirovich Lushchay; 10 February 1982 – 28 March 2024) was a Ukrainian soldier and an administrator(Юрий Владимирович Л.) of Russian Wikipedia, historian and amateur poet.

== Early life and education ==
Lushchai was born on 10 February 1982 in Kramatorsk. His parents worked at a factory.

Lushchai started to be interested in history while studying at school. In 2006, he finished his master's degree at the Faculty of History in National University of Kharkiv. He was conducting historical research. In the early 2010s, he was a Ph.D. student at Kharkiv National Pedagogical University.

== Career and writing ==
Lushchai worked as a teacher and lecturer. He began writing poems in Ukrainian in 1995. In 2000, Lushchai started to write rhymed poems, and in 2018, began writing fairy tales. He published a book in 2023.

=== As a Wikipedian ===
He wrote more than 300 articles in Russian Wikipedia. In Russian Wikipedia, he was 122nd among Wikipedians by the amount of edits made. His last edit was made on 25 March 2024. He was also a long-serving administrator in Russian Wikipedia.

== Personal life and death ==
In 2009, Lushchai registered on Russian Wikipedia. He became a patrolled user in 2012, and an administrator in 2018. Lushchai started approximately 300 articles. In 2015, 2017, and 2020, he was a member of Russian Wikipedia's Arbitration Committee.

On 6 April 2022, after the beginning of Russian invasion of Ukraine, he moved with his family to Velyki Luchky in the Zakarpattia Oblast in western Ukraine. Lushchai enlisted in the Ukrainian Army in January 2023, after several attempts. He was killed in action while defending his native Donetsk Oblast. Starting from 28 March, he was regarded as missing. Lushchai died near Ivanivske, Donetsk Oblast. He was buried on 10 April in Mukachevo Raion in Zakarpattia Oblast.

== Legacy ==
According to Dmitry Kuzmin, as an important contributor to Russian Wikipedia, Lushchai is the most significant Russian cultural figure killed at Russo-Ukrainian War, and it is symbolic that he was fighting for Ukraine.

== See also ==
- List of Wikipedia people
