= Martin Haase =

German linguistics professor (born 1962)

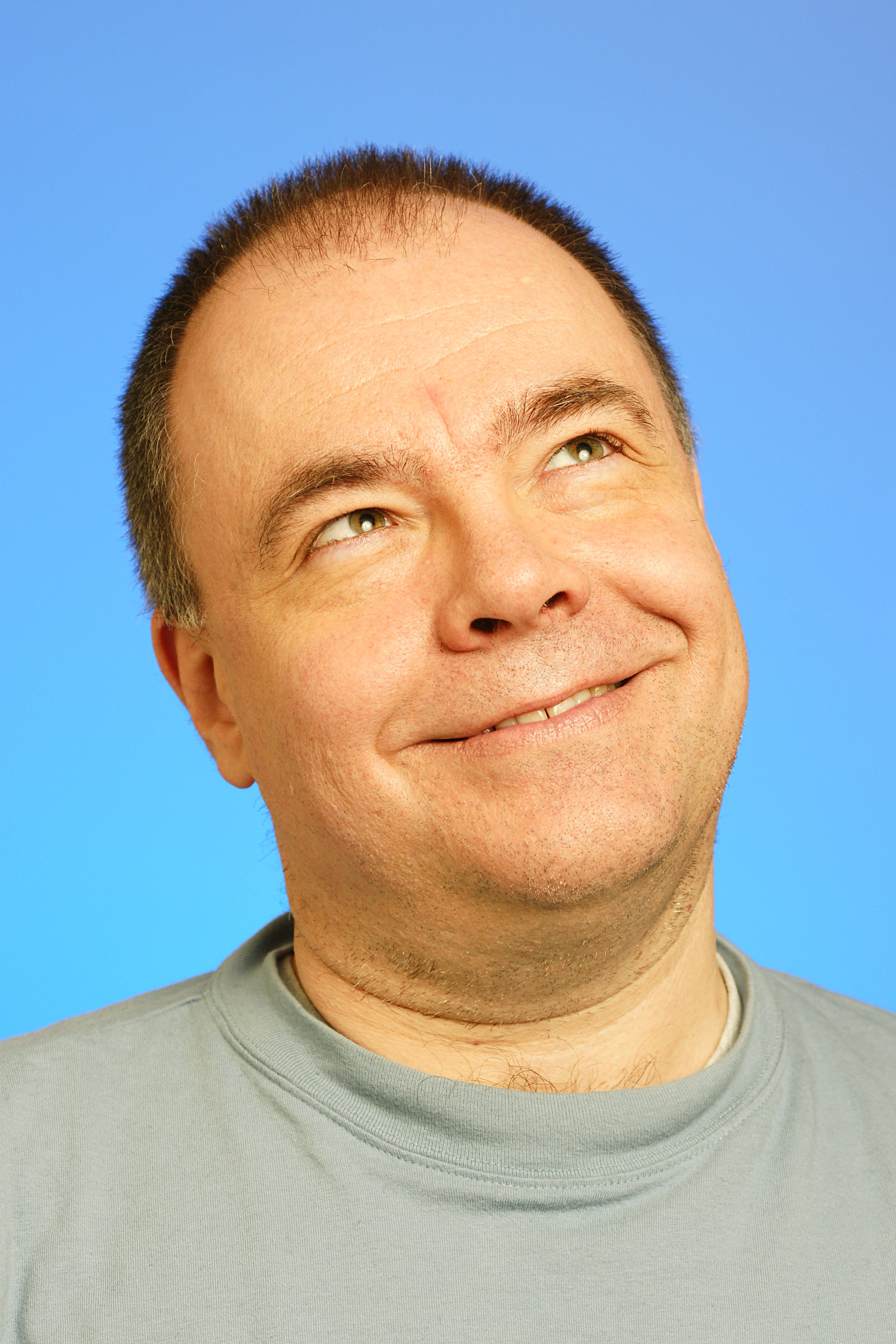
Martin Haase, December 2009

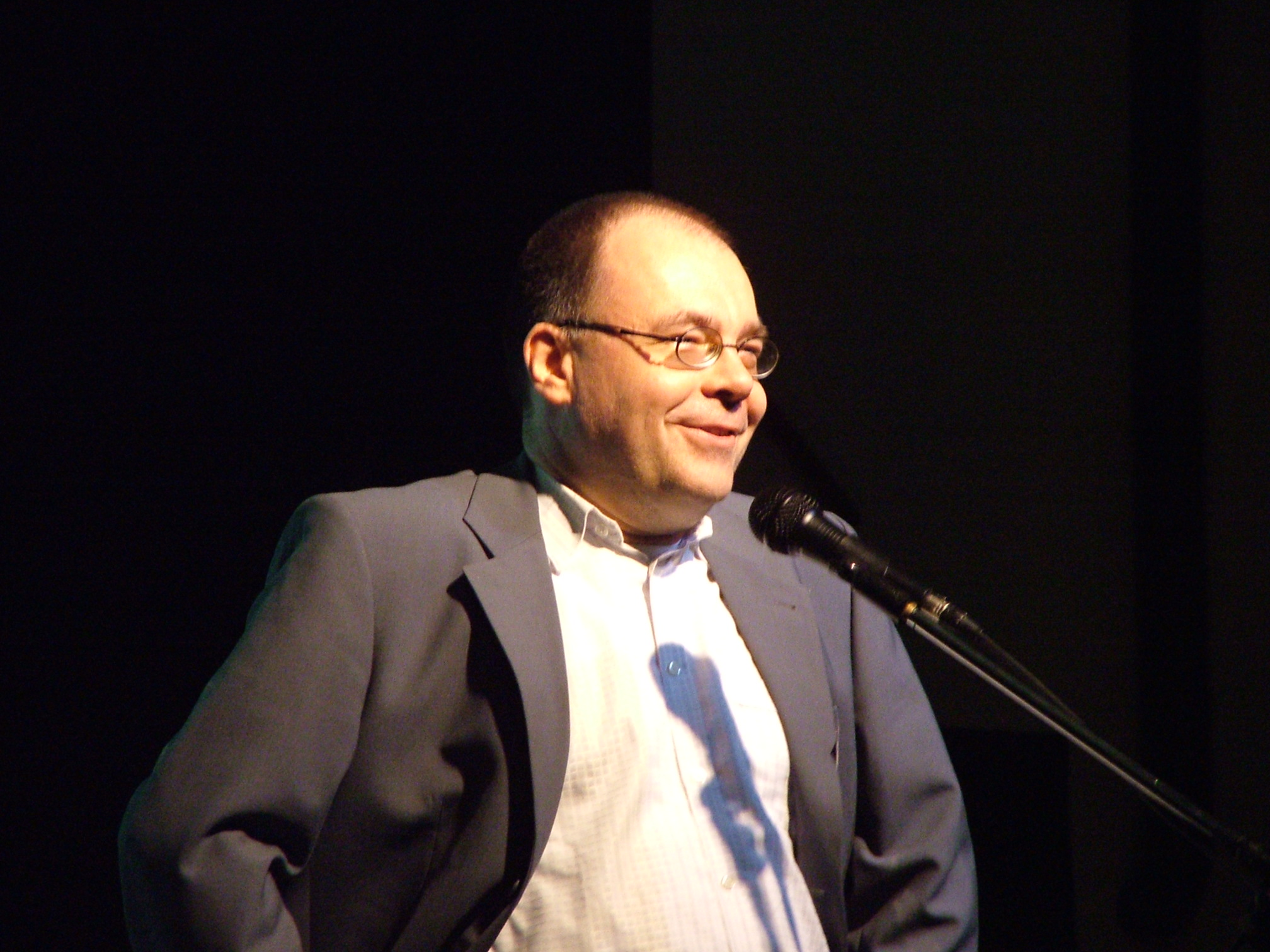
Haase lecturing at the 50th Esperanto Internacia Seminario in Wewelsburg, December 2006

Martin Haase's voice
recorded September 18, 2014

Martin Haase (born 25 October 1962) is a German linguistics professor at the University of Bamberg as well as a linguist, polyglot, and podcaster.

== Education ==
After secondary school graduation from Helene-Lange-Gymnasium (Dortmund, 1982), Haase studied general linguistics, Romance languages and historical and comparative linguistics at the Universities of Toulouse and Cologne, writing his 1991 Ph.D. thesis on language contact and language change: Die Einflüsse des Gaskognischen und Französischen auf das Baskische ("The influences of Gascon (Occitan) and French on the Basque language").

After further study at the University of Hamburg in 1992, Haase worked as an assistant professor at the University of Osnabrück. In 1997 he earned his habilitation with a second thesis, Dialektdynamik in Mittelitalien: Sprachveränderungsprozesse im umbrischen Apenninenraum ("Dialectal dynamics in central Italy: Language evolution in the Umbrian Apennines"). He subsequently took professorships at the Albert Ludwig University of Freiburg, the Free University of Berlin and Technische Universität Berlin.

In 2001 he became a professor at the University of Bremen. The following year he accepted the Chair in Romance Linguistics at the University of Bamberg, where he has taught ever since.

== Volunteer activities ==
Haase is committed to open source and open content projects. He is a Wikipedia author who served as a member of Wikimedia Germany's advisory board (2005–2007); he did not stand for re-election. Living mainly in Berlin, he is a member of the Chaos Computer Club, having served since 2009 as its board representative to the experience exchange groups (Erfahrungsaustauschkreise). Since 2009 he has also been a member of the Pirate party; the party supports government transparency, a right to information privacy and an end to genetic patents and Internet censorship in Germany but has no seats in the Bundestag.

== Esperanto movement ==
As an undergraduate student Haase learned the international planned language Esperanto. He was active in the Esperanto youth group Germana Esperanto-Junularo, acting in an amateur theatrical group called Kia koincido ("What a coincidence"), and serving as its national chair from 1988 to 1990. Today he is director of the German Esperanto Institute and an associate member of the International Academy of Sciences, San Marino, where the main working language is Esperanto.

== Other linguistic interests ==
Haase is a polyglot; he speaks German, English, French, Italian, Spanish, Basque and Esperanto, as well as the Catalan and Occitan. He is also able to read Latin, Ancient Greek, Sanskrit, Gothic, Dutch, Romanian, Russian, Maltese, Swahili and Samoan, and to communicate using German Sign Language (Deutsche Gebärdensprache, DGS).

== See also ==
- List of Wikipedia people
