= Tomasz Ganicz =

Polish chemist (born 1966)

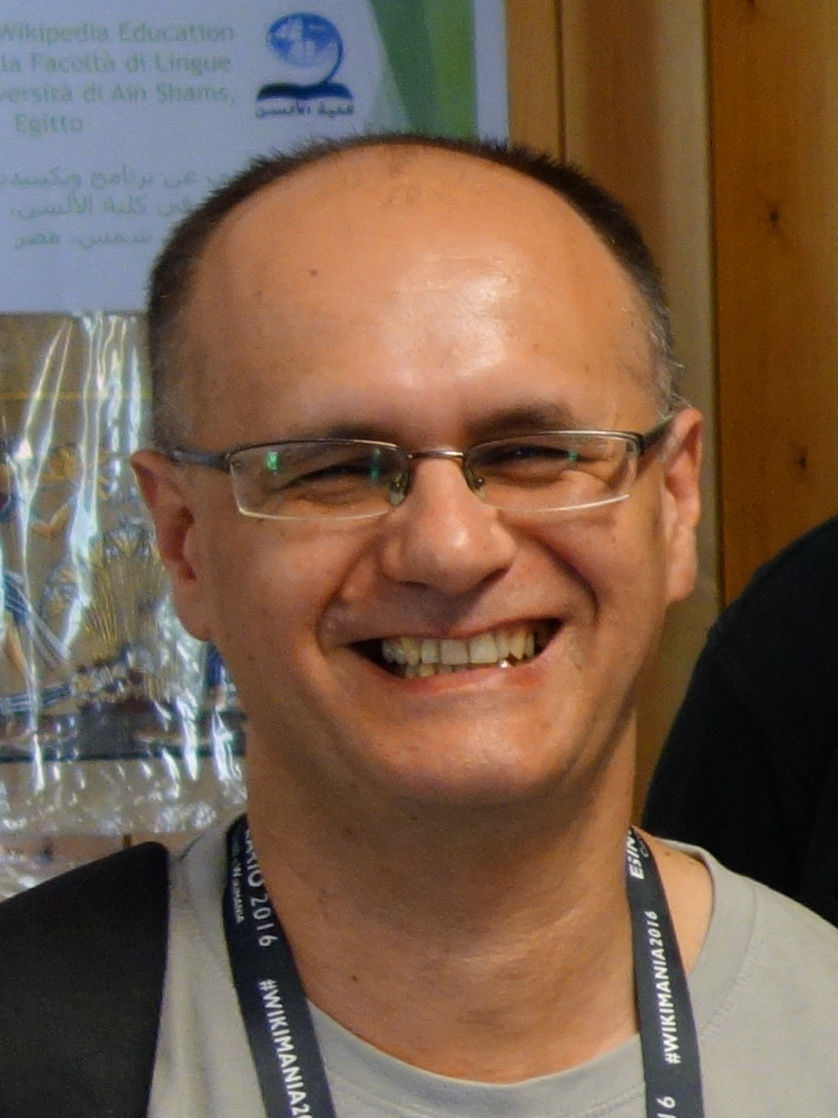
- Ganicz in 2016
- Born: 27 August 1966 (age 60); Łódź, Poland
- Education: Technical University of Lodz
- Scientific career
- Fields: Chemistry
- Workplaces: Military University of Technology in Warsaw

Tomasz Ganicz, ps. Polimerek (born 27 August 1966 in Łódź), is a Polish chemist, doctor habilitas of chemical sciences and professor extraordinarius at the Military University of Technology in Warsaw. He was the president of Wikimedia Polska (2007–2018).

== Life ==
He graduated from chemistry at the Technical University of Lodz (1991).

== See also ==
- List of Wikipedia people
