= Yaroslav Blanter =

Russian physicist (born 1967)

- Ярослав Блантер
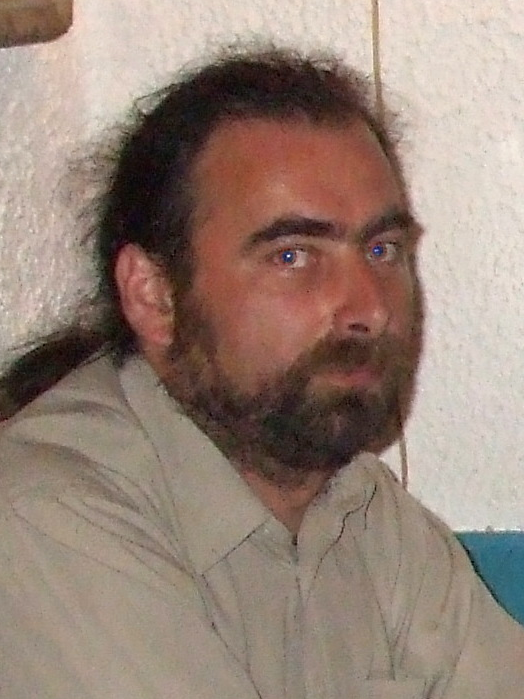
- Blanter in 2008
- Born: 19 November 1967 (age 58); Moscow, Soviet Union
- Education: Moscow Institute of Steel and Alloys
- Scientific career
- Fields: Physics, extractive metallurgy
- Workplaces: Delft University of Technology

Yaroslav Mikhaylovich Blanter (Russian: Ярослав Михайлович Блантер; born 19 November 1967) is a Russian physicist, an expert in the field of extractive metallurgy and condensed matter physics. As of 2011, he is a professor at the Delft University of Technology.

== Biography ==
Blanter was born in Moscow, Russia. In 1984, he graduated from the Second physico-mathematical school of Moscow.

In 1990, he graduated from the physicochemical department of the Moscow Institute of Steel and Alloys in the field of extractive metallurgy.

Until 1992, he took post-graduate courses at the same institute. In 1992, he defended his thesis and received the Candidate of physico-mathematical sciences degree. The subject of the thesis concerned the development of the quantum effects in the kinetic properties of the electronic systems at the topological transition.

From 1990 to 1994, he taught statistical physics, the theory of normal and superconducting metals, classical and quantum mechanics. From 1989 to 1993, he also taught mathematics at the 43rd School of Moscow.

In 1995, supported by the Alexander von Humboldt Foundation, he obtained a position at the Institute of Condensed Matter Theory in Karlsruhe. From 1996 to 2000, he held a position at the University of Geneva. From 2000 to 2007, he was an associate professor at the Delft University of Technology. In 2007, he became a senior associate professor there. In 2002, he was one of three members of the organizing committee of the NATO Advanced Research Workshop "Quantum Noise in Mesoscopic Physics", held in Delft, the Netherlands.

From 2007 to 2011, he was an active contributor with administrator permissions in the Russian Wikipedia and a member of its Arbitration Committee. The Daily Dot noted Blanter's role in the deletion of an English Wikipedia hoax about a ficticous Russian filmmaker which was up for almost four years.

== Selected works ==
Blanter has published over 100 works in several scientific journals. According to Scopus his h-factor is 47.

== See also ==
- List of Wikipedia people

== Books ==
- Nazarov, Yuli V.; Blanter, Yaroslav M.; Quantum Transport: Introduction to Nanoscience, Cambridge University Press, 2009. ISBN 978-0-521-83246-5.
