= Gangadhar Bhadani =

Prolific Indian Wikipedian (1951–2018)

- गंगाधर भदानी
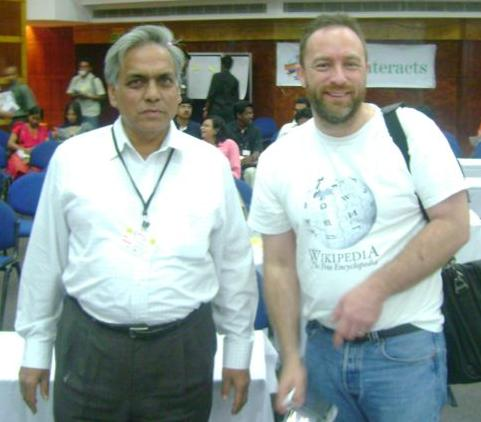
- Gangadhar Bhadani with Jimmy Wales during Wikicamp at Chennai in the year 2007
- Born: 1951; Ranchi
- Died: 8 February 2018 (aged 66–67)
- Citizenship: Indian
- Occupations: Bank officer; Author; Wikipedian
- Known for: Actively editing Wikipedia; Among top ten worldwide Wikipedia contributors
- Notable work: Book - "Choice in Chaos"
- Parents: Hari Ram (father); Panna Devi (mother)
- Honours: A prolific Indian Wikipedian

Gangadhar Bhadani (Devanagari: गंगाधर भदानी) was a well known Indian Wikipedian. He belonged to the city of Ranchi in the state of Jharkhand in India. He was an Indian bank officer at the Bank of India. He was also an author. He authored a book on his own autobiography. His book was an autobiography of a wikipedian. His autobiographical book's name is "Choice in Chaos". He was described as a prolific Indian Wikipedian by the co-founder Jimmy Wales of the Wikipedia.

== Early life ==
He was born in the city of Ranchi in India in the year 1951. His father name was Hari Ram and mother name was Panna Devi.

== Later life ==
Gangadhar Bhadani started his career as a banker. He joined as an officer at the Indian public sector financial institution Bank of India. In the year 2005, he suddenly encountered with the Wikipedia site having several articles and found that anyone was allowed to edit the articles. Due to his curosity of the articles editing, he joined the Wikipedia as an editor that year. After just 6 months he also became an admin of the Wikipedia.

Later, he was one of the top ten worldwide Wikipedia contributors for several months. He traveled different parts of India during his banking career. In his book "Choice in Chaos", he had mentioned that he had lived at 17 different places in India at 23 different houses.

== Death ==
Gangadhar Bhadani died on 8 February 2018.
