= Techweek (conference) =

Techweek is an annual technology event created in 2011 as a means to connect Chicago’s technology startup scene. The event has since expanded into different cities.

== History ==
The 2011 conference drew 2,487 attendees and had 220 speakers.

Since 2011, Techweek has grown into a multi-day conference and expo, including a startup competition, a job fair, and nightly parties, including a fashion show.

In its first three years, Techweek expanded beyond Chicago to host conferences in Los Angeles, New York, Miami, and Detroit.

In 2015, the conference was launched in Kansas City as Techweek Kansas City. The 2018 event was scheduled for October 8-12.
