= Central Auditing Commission of the 22nd Congress of the Communist Party of the Soviet Union =

This electoral term of the Central Auditing Commission was elected by the 22nd Congress of the Communist Party of the Soviet Union in 1961, and was in session until the convocation of the 23rd Congress in 1966.

== Composition ==
Members of the Central Auditing Commission of the 22nd Congress of the Communist Party of the Soviet Union
Name	Cyrillic	20th CAC	23rd CAC	Birth	Death	PM	Nationality	Gender	Ref.
Abdulhak Abdraziakov	Абдулхак Абдразяков	New	Not	1915	1984	1939	Tatar	Male	
Vasily Abyzov	Тихон Абабков	New	Not	1907	1979	1940	Russian	Male	
Hovhannes Baghdasaryan	Оганес Багдасарян	New	Not	1914	1997	1939	Armenian	Male	
Sergey Baskakov	Сергей Баскаков	New	Reelected	1911	1986	1931	Russian	Male	
Nurberdy Bayramov	Нурберды Байрамов	New	Not	1912	1986	1939	Turkmen	Male	
Anna Boykova	Анна Бойкова	Old	Not	1918	2001	1940	Russian	Female	
Evgeniy Bugaev	Евгений Бугаёв	New	Not	1912	1997	1939	Russian	Male	
Galina Burkatskaya	Евгений Буркацкая	New	Not	1916	2006	1946	Ukrainian	Female	
Evgeniy Cherednichenko	Евгений Чередниченко	Old	Reelected	1912	1986	1931	Russian	Male	
Raisa Dementyeva	Раиса Дементьева	New	CC	1925	Alive	1948	Russian	Female	
Aleksandr Dmitrin	Александр Дмитрин	New	Not	1914	2001	1938	Russian	Male	
Vasily Drozdenko	Василий Дрозденко	New	Not	1924	1982	1944	Ukrainian	Male	
Giorgi Dzotsenidze	Георгий Дзоценидзе	New	Reelected	1910	1976	1940	Georgian	Male	
Anatoly Egorov	Анатолий Егоров	New	CC	1920	1997	1944	Russian	Male	
Pyotr Elistratov	Пётр Елистратов	New	Not	1917	1987	1939	Russian	Male	
Alexander Gorkin	Александр Горкин	Old	Reelected	1897	1988	1916	Russian	Male	
Basan Gorodovikov	Басан Городовиков	New	CC	1910	1983	1939	Kalmyk	Male	
Dmitry Goryunov	Дмитрий Горюнов	New	CC	1915	1992	1940	Russian	Male	
Mikhail Gribkov	Михаил Грибков	New	Died	1909	1964	1939	Russian	Male	
Saftar Jafarov	Сафтар Джафаров	New	Died	1900	1961	1920	Azerbaijani	Male	
Bilar Kabaloev	Билар Кабалоев	New	Not	1917	2009	1940	Russian	Male	
Yakov Kabkov	Яков Кабков	New	Reelected	1908	2001	1930	Russian	Male	
Tikhon Khrennikov	Александр Трофимов	New	Reelected	1913	2007	1947	Russian	Male	
Vladimir Kochetov	Всеволод Кочетов	Old	Not	1912	1973	1944	Russian	Male	
Ivan Koditsa	Яков Кодица	New	Not	1899	1980	1927	Moldovan	Male	
Grigory Kozlov	Григорий Козлов	New	CC	1912	1968	1943	Russian	Male	
Stepan Krasovsky	Степан Красовский	New	Not	1897	1983	1918	Belarusian	Male	
Yakov Kreizer	Яков Крейзер	New	Not	1905	1969	1925	Jew	Male	
Turabay Kulatov	Турабай Кулатов	Old	Reelected	1908	1984	1932	Kyrgyz	Male	
Maria Kulikova	Мария Куликова	New	Not	1917	1999	1942	Russian	Female	
Vladimir Lobanok	Владимир Лобанок	New	Reelected	1907	1984	1930	Belarusian	Male	
Vladimir Malin	Владимир Малин	Old	Not	1906	1982	1926	Russian	Male	
Nikolay Martynov	Николай Мартынов	New	Not	1910	1998	1932	Russian	Male	
Nikolay Mironov	Николай Миронов	New	Died	1913	1964	1940	Russian	Male	
Zoya Mironova	Зоя Миронова	Old	Not	1912	1991	1940	Russian	Female	
Pyotr Morozov	Николай Мартынов	New	Not	1908	1977	1939	Russian	Male	
Vasily Moskovsky	Василий Московский	Old	Reelected	1904	1984	1928	Russian	Male	
Nonna Muravyova	Нонна Муравьёва	Old	Reelected	1906	1986	1926	Russian	Female	
Mikhail Orlov	Михаил Орлов	Old	Reelected	1912	1996	1940	Russian	Male	
Ivan Pankin	Иван Панькин	New	Not	1909	?	1930	Russian	Male	
Aleksandr Panyushkin	Алекса́ндр Па́нюшкин	Old	Reelected	1905	1974	1927	Russian	Male	
Pyotr Pigalev	Пётр Пигалев	New	Reelected	1911	1975	1931	Russian	Male	
Viktor Podzerko	Виктор Подзерко	Old	CC	1912	?	1940	Ukrainian	Male	
Boris Popov	Борис Попов	New	Reelected	1909	1993	1931	Russian	Male	
Aleksandr Prokofiev	Алекса́ндр Проко́фьев	Old	Not	1900	1971	1919	Russian	Male	
Vladimir Promyslov	Владимир Промыслов	Old	Not	1908	1993	1928	Russian	Male	
Mirzo Rakhmatov	Пётр Пигалев	New	Not	1914	1998	1940	Tajik	Male	
Isagali Sharipov	Исагали Шарипов	New	Died	1905	1976	1926	Kazakh	Male	
Iosif Shikin	Иосиф Шикин	Old	Reelected	1906	1973	1927	Russian	Male	
Grigory Shuisky	Григорий Шуйский	New	Not	1907	1985	1930	Ukrainian	Male	
Vladimir Semyonov	Владимир Семёнов	Old	CC	1911	1992	1938	Russian	Male	
Ivan Senkin	Иван Сенькин	New	CC	1915	1986	1940	Karelian	Male	
Vladimir Serov	Владимир Серов	New	Reelected	1910	1968	1942	Russian	Male	
Nikolai Skripko	Николай Скрипко	New	Not	1902	1987	1927	Russian	Male	
Vladimir Smirnov	Владимир Смирнов	New	Not	1908	1983	1939	Russian	Male	
Vasily Snatin	Василий Снастин	New	Not	1913	1976	1939	Russian	Male	
Aleksandr Soldatov	Александр Солдатов	New	Reelected	1915	1999	1939	Russian	Male	
Vladimir Starovsky	Владимир Старовский	New	Reelected	1905	1975	1939	Komi	Male	
Vladimir Stepakov	Владимир Степаков	New	CC	1912	1987	1939	Russian	Male	
Alexander Trofimov	Александр Трофимов	New	Not	1903	1980	1927	Russian	Male	
Sergey Vinogradov	Сергей Виноградов	Old	Not	1907	1970	1926	Russian	Male	
Ivan Vladychenko	Иван Владыченко	New	CC	1924	2022	1943	Ukrainian	Male	
Fayzrakhman Zagafuranov	Файзрахман Загафуранов	New	Not	1913	1975	1939	Bashkir	Male	
Yuri Zhukov	Георгий Жуков	Old	Reelected	1908	1991	1943	Russian	Male	
Mikhail Zimyanin	Михаил Зимянин	Old	CC	1914	1995	1939	Belarusian	Male	
