= Central Auditing Commission of the 20th Congress of the Communist Party of the Soviet Union =

This electoral term of the Central Auditing Commission was elected by the 20th Congress of the Communist Party of the Soviet Union in 1956, and was in session until the convocation of the 22nd Congress in 1961.

== Composition ==
Members of the Central Auditing Commission of the 20th Congress of the Communist Party of the Soviet Union
Name	Cyrillic	19th CAC	22nd CAC	Birth	Death	PM	Nationality	Gender	Ref.
Tikhon Ababkov	Тихон Абабков	New	Not	1908	1984	1929	Russian	Male	
Sergey Abalin	Сергей Абалин	New	Suicide	1901	1956	1924	Russian	Male	
Vladimir Agkatsev	Владимир Агкацев	New	Not	1911	2000	1937	Ossetian	Male	
Shmavon Arushanyan	Арушанян Минасович	New	CC	1903	1982	1926	Armenian	Male	
Vasily Babich	Василий Бабич	Old	Not	1912	1988	1931	Ukrainian	Male	
Anna Boykova	Анна Бойкова	New	Reelected	1918	2001	1940	Russian	Female	
Evgeniy Cherednichenko	Евгений Чередниченко	New	Reelected	1912	1986	1931	Russian	Male	
Pyotr Doroshenko	Пётр Дорошенко	New	Not	1907	1982	1939	Ukrainian	Male	
Fedor Dubkovetsky	Фёдор Дубковецкий	New	Died	1894	1960	1926	Ukrainian	Male	
Alexander Gorkin	Александр Горкин	Old	Reelected	1897	1988	1916	Russian	Male	
Grigory Gromov	Григорий громов	Old	Not	1903	1973	1924	Russian	Male	
Konstantin Gubin	Губин Александрович	Old	Not	1897	1979	1919	Russian	Male	
Mirza Ibrahimov	Михаил Зимянин	New	Not	1911	1993	1930	Azerbaijani	Male	
Stepan Ignatov	Степан Игнатов	New	Not	1908	1966	1931	Russian	Male	
Leonid Ilyichev	Леонид Ильичёв	New	CC	1906	1990	1924	Russian	Male	
Ivan Kairov	Иван Каиров	CC	CC	1893	1978	1917	Russian	Male	
Sobir Kamolov	Сабир Камалов	New	Not	1910	1990	1931	Uzbek	Male	
Nikolay Kazmin	Николай Казьмин	New	Not	1904	1963	1928	Russian	Male	
Aleksandr Kidin	Александр Кидин	CC	Died	1909	1959	1930	Russian	Male	
Vladimir Kirillin	Владимир Кириллин	New	CC	1913	1999	1937	Russian	Male	
Vladimir Kochetov	Всеволод Кочетов	New	Reelected	1912	1973	1944	Russian	Male	
Grigory Kosyachenko	Григо́рий Косяче́нко	Old	Not	1900	1983	1917	Ukrainian	Male	
Turabay Kulatov	Турабай Кулатов	Old	Reelected	1908	1984	1932	Kyrgyz	Male	
Iosif Kuzmin	Иосиф Кузьмин	New	Not	1910	1996	1930	Russian	Male	
Nikolai Kuzmin	Николай Кузьмин	New	Not	1919	1963	1947	Russian	Male	
Fedor Kuznetsov	Фёдор Кузнецов	Comeback	Not	1904	1979	1926	Russian	Male	
Mikhail Lazurenko	Николай Кузьмин	New	Not	1908	1987	1932	Ukrainian	Male	
Vladimir Lukyanov	Владимир Лукьянов	CC	Died	1901	1958	1927	Russian	Male	
Vladimir Malin	Владимир Малин	New	Reelected	1906	1982	1926	Russian	Male	
Mikhail Malinin	Михаил Малинин	CC	Not	1899	1960	1931	Russian	Male	
Kirill Meretskov	Кирилл Мерецков	CC	Not	1897	1968	1917	Russian	Male	
Zoya Mironova	Зоя Миронова	Old	Reelected	1912	1991	1940	Russian	Female	
Pyotr Moskatov	Пётр Москатов	Old	Not	1894	1969	1917	Russian	Male	
Vasily Moskovsky	Василий Московский	Old	Reelected	1904	1984	1928	Russian	Male	
Nonna Muravyova	Нонна Муравьёва	New	Reelected	1906	1986	1926	Russian	Female	
Mikhail Orlov	Михаил Орлов	New	Reelected	1912	1996	1940	Russian	Male	
Georgy Osipov	Георгий Осипов	Old	Not	1906	1980	1927	Russian	Male	
Valentin Ososkov	Валентин Ососков	New	Not	1912	1973	1940	Russian	Male	
Balysh Ovezov	Балы́ш Ове́зов	Old	CC	1915	1975	1939	Turkmen	Male	
Kārlis Ozoliņš	Карл Озолинь	New	Not	1905	1987	1926	Latvian	Male	
Nikolay Palgunov	Николай Пальгунов	New	Not	1898	1971	1919	Russian	Male	
Aleksandr Panyushkin	Алекса́ндр Па́нюшкин	Comeback	Reelected	1905	1974	1927	Russian	Male	
Viktor Podzerko	Виктор Подзерко	New	Reelected	1912	?	1940	Ukrainian	Male	
Dmitriy Polikarpov	Дмитрий Поликарпов	New	CC	1905	1965	1924	Russian	Male	
Pavel Prokkonen	Павел Прокконен	Old	Not	1909	1979	1930	Finn	Male	
Aleksandr Prokofiev	Алекса́ндр Проко́фьев	New	Reelected	1900	1971	1919	Russian	Male	
Vladimir Promyslov	Владимир Промыслов	New	Reelected	1908	1993	1928	Russian	Male	
Georgy Pushkin	Георгий Пушкин	New	CC	1909	1963	1939	Russian	Male	
Nikolay Rozhanchuk	Николай Рожанчук	New	Not	1910	1982	1932	Ukrainian	Male	
Pavel Satyukov	Павел Сатюков	New	CC	1911	1976	1939	Ukrainian	Male	
Vladimir Semyonov	Владимир Семёнов	Old	Reelected	1911	1992	1938	Russian	Male	
Volodymyr Shcherbytsky	Владимир Щербицкий	New	CC	1918	1990	1941	Ukrainian	Male	
Iosif Shikin	Иосиф Шикин	New	Reelected	1906	1973	1927	Russian	Male	
Konstantin Simonov	Сергей Виноградов	CC	Not	1915	1979	1942	Russian	Male	
Alexey Spiridonov	Алексей Спиридонов	Old	Not	1909	1988	1929	Russian	Male	
Mikhail Suyetin	Михаил Суетин	Old	Not	1906	1986	1925	Russian	Male	
Tursun Uljabayev	Турсунбай Ульджабаев	New	Not	1916	1988	1939	Uzbek	Male	
Sergey Vinogradov	Сергей Виноградов	New	Reelected	1907	1970	1926	Russian	Male	
Georgy Vorobyov	Георгий Воробьёв	New	CC	1914	2002	1939	Russian	Male	
Aleksandr Yakovlev	Александр Яковлев	New	Not	1911	1989	1939	Russian	Male	
Ismail Yusupov	Исмаил Юсупов	New	CC	1914	2005	1940	Uyghur	Male	
Yuri Zhukov	Георгий Жуков	New	Reelected	1908	1991	1943	Russian	Male	
Mikhail Zimyanin	Михаил Зимянин	CC	Reelected	1914	1995	1939	Belarusian	Male	
