= TASS =

Russian state-owned news agency

Russian News Agency TASS

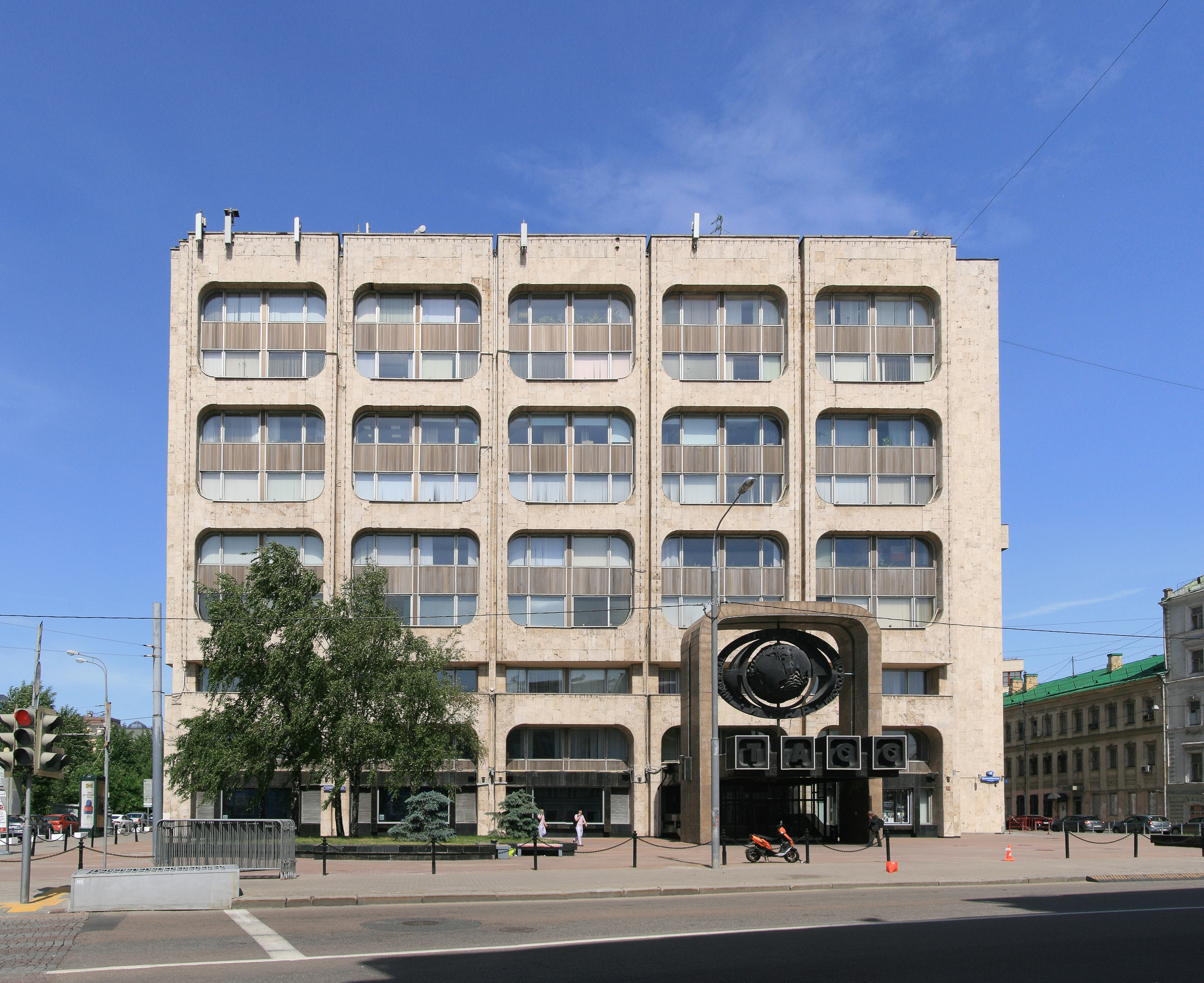
- TASS Soviet-era brutalist building in Moscow
- Type: Federal State Unitary Enterprise
- Industry: State media news agency
- Founded: 1904
- Headquarters: Moscow, Russia
- Area served: Worldwide
- Key people: Andrey Kondrashov (director)
- Products: News media, Disinformation, Propaganda
- Owner: Wholly owned by federal government (as federal unitary enterprise)
- Website: tass.com

The Russian News Agency TASS, (Note: Russian: Информационное агентство России ТАСС, romanized: Informatsionnoye agentstvo Rossii TASS) or simply TASS, is a state-owned news agency. Established in the Russian Empire in 1904 as the Saint Petersburg Telegraph Agency, it is the largest in Russia and one of the largest worldwide.

TASS is registered as a Federal State Unitary Enterprise, owned by the Government of Russia. Headquartered in Moscow, it has 70 offices in Russia and in the Commonwealth of Independent States (CIS), "along with 56 global branches in 53 countries".

In the Soviet period, it was named the Telegraph Agency of the Soviet Union (Note: Russian: Телеграфное агентство Советского Союза, romanized: Telegrafnoye agentstvo Sovetskogo Soyuza) and was the central agency of the Soviet government for news collection and distribution for all Soviet newspapers, radio and television stations. After the dissolution of the Soviet Union, it was renamed Information Telegraph Agency of Russia (ITAR-TASS) (Note: Russian: Информационное телеграфное агентство России (ИТАР-ТАСС), romanized: Informatsionnoye telegrafnoye agentstvo Rossii (ITAR-TASS)) in 1992, but reverted to the simpler TASS name in 2014. Currently, TASS publishes "nearly 3,000 news items in six languages and about 700 photographs and videos from correspondents in Russia and across the world" on a daily basis.

== History ==
=== 1902: TTA, SPTA, PTA, ROSTA ===
The origin of TASS dates back to December 1902 when it began operations as the Commercial Telegraph Agency (TTA) (Note: Russian: Торгово-телеграфное агентство, romanized: Torgovo-telegrafnoye agentstvo) under the Ministry of Finance, with the staff of the Commercial and Industrial Gazette (Note: Russian: Торгово-промышленная газета, romanized: Torgovo-Promyshlennaya Gazeta) supplying most of its journalists. As the demand for non-business news began during the first battles of the Russo-Japanese War in February 1904, the agency changed its name to the Saint Petersburg Telegraph Agency (SPTA) (Note: Russian: Санкт-Петербургское телеграфное агентство, romanized: Sankt-Peterburgskoye telegrafnoye agentstvo). As there was no change of headquarters and almost no change in its staff and function, it was a mere rebranding.

In August 1914, one day after Saint Petersburg was renamed Petrograd, SPTA was renamed the Petrograd Telegraph Agency (PTA) (Note: Russian: Петроградское телеграфное агентство, romanized: Petrogradskoye telegrafnoye agentstvo). It was seized by the Bolsheviks in November 1917 and by December was renamed as the Central Information Agency of the Soviet Russian Council of People's Commissars. On 7 September 1918, the presidium renamed PTA and the Press bureau into the Russian Telegraph Agency (ROSTA) (Note: Russian: Российское телеграфное агентство, romanized: Rossiyskoye telegrafnoye agentstvo), which became "the central information agency of the whole Russian Socialist Federative Soviet Republic".

=== 1925: TASS ===
On 10 July 1925, the Telegraph Agency of the Soviet Union (TASS) (Note: Russian: Телеграфное агентство Советского Союза, romanized: Telegrafnoye agentstvo Sovetskogo Soyuza) was established by a decree of the Presidium of the Supreme Soviet, and took over the duties of the ROSTA as the country's central information agency. TASS enjoyed "exclusive right to gather and distribute information outside the Soviet Union, as well as the right to distribute foreign and domestic information within the Soviet Union, and manage the news agencies of the Soviet republics". Official state information was delivered as the TASS Report (Note: Russian: Сообщение ТАСС, romanized: Soobshcheniye TASS).

TASS included affiliated news agencies in all 14 (in 1940–1956, 15) Soviet republics in addition to Russia: RATAU (Ukrainian SSR, now Ukrinform), BelTA (Byelorussian SSR), ETA (Estonian SSR), Latinform (Latvian SSR, now LETA), ELTA (Lithuanian SSR), ATEM (Moldavian SSR, now Moldpres), Armenpress (Armenian SSR), Gruzinform (Georgian SSR), Azerinform (Azerbaijan SSR, now AZERTAC), UzTAG (Uzbek SSR, now UzA), KazTAG (Kazakh SSR, now Kazinform), KyrTAG (Kyrgyz SSR, now Kabar), Turkmeninform (Turkmen SSR, now TDH) and TajikTA (Tajik SSR, now Khovar). Over the history other affiliates existed, e.g. KarelfinTAG for the short-lived Karelo-Finnish SSR (1940–1956). In addition to producing reports for general consumption, TASS produced packages of content for non-public use. Western news reports and potentially embarrassing domestic news would be compiled daily into a collection known as "White TASS", and particularly sensitive news would be compiled into a smaller collection known as "Red TASS". These collections were made available only to top journalists and political leaders, respectively.

In 1961, RIA Novosti was created to supplement TASS, mainly in foreign reporting and human-interest stories. After 1971, TASS was elevated to the status of State Committee at the Government of the Soviet Union.

The agency was frequently used as a front organization by the Soviet intelligence agencies, such as the NKVD (later KGB) and Main Intelligence Directorate, with TASS employees serving as informants abroad. In 1959, Alexander Alexeyev was dispatched to Cuba on a fact-finding mission, ostensibly working for TASS. Former Georgetown University professor James David Atkinson stated that TASS was an "effective propaganda medium" but that it concentrated "more heavily on espionage than on other activities." TASS frequently served as a vector for Soviet active measures. On 11 July 1975, TASS was awarded the Order of the October Revolution by the Soviet government.

=== 1992: ITAR-TASS ===
In January 1992, following the dissolution of the Soviet Union, a presidential decree signed by Boris Yeltsin redefined the status of TASS and renamed it the Information Telegraph Agency of Russia. In May 1994, the Russian Government adopted a resolution "On approval of the Charter of the Information Telegraph Agency of Russia", under which it operates as a central government news agency. The TASS acronym was, by this point, well-recognized around the world and so was retained after being redefined as the Telegraph Agency of Communication and Messages (Note: Russian: Телеграфное агентство связи и сообщения, romanized: Telegrafnoye agentstvo svyazi i soobshcheniya). The agency as a whole was referred to as "ITAR-TASS".

In October 2014, the agency reverted to its former name as the Russian News Agency TASS.

== Organization ==
TASS is registered as a Federal State Unitary Enterprise, owned by the Government of Russia. Headquartered in Moscow, TASS has 70 offices in Russia and in the Commonwealth of Independent States (CIS), as well as 68 bureaus around the world.

=== TASS press center ===
TASS multi-media press center is a media and communication platform in the heart of Moscow. Every year it hosts some 300 events featuring high-ranking Russian officials, foreign heads of state, leaders of main political parties, representatives of the world of arts and culture, scientists and sporting personalities as well as managers of Russian and foreign business enterprises. TASS press centers also operate in St. Petersburg, Yekaterinburg and Novosibirsk.

TASS is a media partner of high-profile conferences, forums and exhibitions in Russia and abroad. The agency organized the first News Agencies World Congress (NAWC) in 2004.

=== TASS building ===
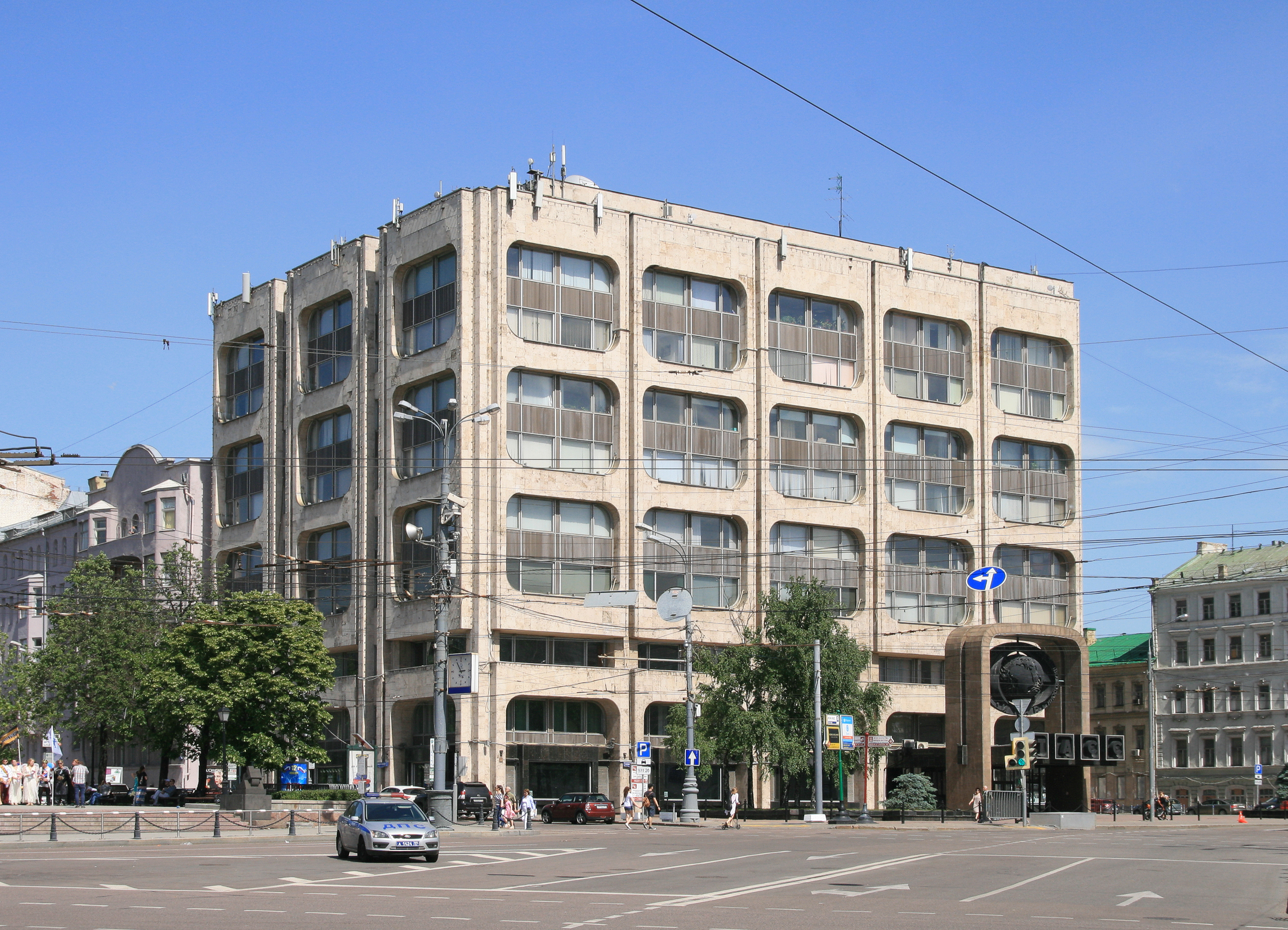
TASS building

TASS is headquartered in a building in the Soviet brutalist style built in 1977. In November 2021, an association of Russian architects criticized plans by Moscow city authorities to renovate the building without due regard for the preservation of its historic appearance.

== Controversies and criticisms ==
TASS has been cited as a source of disinformation as part of Russian influence operations.

=== Russian invasion of Ukraine ===
- On 27 February 2022, "under the circumstances of the new media regulation enforced by the Russian government, which is heavily restricting media freedom", the European Alliance of News Agencies (EANA) unanimously decided to suspend TASS as "not being able to provide unbiased news", pending an exclusion decision. In response to the suspension, TASS Deputy Director General Mikhail Gusman defended the agency as a credible, professional, and politically independent organization. An attempt to permanently expel TASS from EANA failed to gather the required majority in a September 2023 vote, leaving the agency suspended but not expelled.
- In March 2022, Getty Images, after "monitoring Russian state news agency TASS closely since Russia's invasion of Ukraine" decided to end its partnership with TASS for what it said was violating editorial policy. Reuters also removed TASS from its "content marketplace."

As of March 2022, examples of propagation of disinformation in relation to the Russian invasion of Ukraine are as follows:

- TASS quoted Vyacheslav Volodin's false claim that Ukrainian President Volodymyr Zelenskyy fled Kyiv following the invasion. Zelenskyy used social media to post statements, videos and photos to counter this Russian disinformation.
- TASS made unsubstantiated claims that Ukraine was making a nuclear dirty bomb.

== Directors of TASS ==
- M. Fedorov (1902–1904)
- Pavel Miller (1904–1906)
- Sergey Trubachev (1906–1907)
- Alexander Gris (1907–1910)
- Oskar-Ferdinant Lamkert (1910–1917)
- Leonid Stark (1917–1918)
- Lev Sosnovsky (1918–1919)
- Platon Kerzhentsev (1919–1921)
- Nikolay Smirnov (1921)
- Iosif Goldenberg (1921–1922)
- Jacob Doletzky (1922–1937)
- Yakov Khavinson (1937–1943)
- Nikolai Palgunov (1943–1960)
- Dmitry Goryunov (1960–1967)
- Sergey Lapin (1967–1970)
- Leonid Zamyatin (1970–1978)
- Vladimir Khatuntsev (1978–1979)
- Sergei Losev (1979–1988)
- Leonid Kravchenko (1988–1990)
- Lev Spiridonov (1990–1991)
- Vitaly Ignatenko (1991–2012)
- Sergei Mikhailov (2012–2023)
- Andrey Kondrashov (2023–present)

== Notable journalists ==
- Ștefan Foriș, Romanian communist correspondent
- Vsevolod Kukushkin, ice hockey and sports correspondent (22 years)

== See also ==
- State propaganda in the Russian Federation
- Propaganda in the Soviet Union
- Eastern Bloc media and propaganda
- Itar-Tass Russian News Agency v. Russian Kurier, Inc.
