= Leonid Zamyatin =

Soviet ambassador and diplomat (1922–2019)

- Леонид Замятин
- Zamyatin in 1978

Soviet Ambassador to the UK
- In office 10 April 1986 – 19 November 1991
- Preceded by: Viktor Popov
- Succeeded by: Boris Pankin

General Director of TASS news agency
- In office 20 April 1970 – 16 February 1978
- Preceded by: Sergey Lapin
- Succeeded by: Vladimir Khatuntsev

Soviet Ambassador to the IAEA
- In office 1959–1960
- Preceded by: Vasily Emelyanov
- Succeeded by: Vyacheslav Molotov

Personal details
- Born: 9 March 1922 Nizhnedevitsk, Voronezh Governorate RSFSR
- Died: 19 June 2019 (aged 97) Russian Federation
- Resting place: Kuntsevo Cemetery
- Party: CPSU
- Education: Moscow Aviation Institute; Soviet MFA Diplomatic School

Leonid Mitrofanovich Zamyatin (Russian: Леонид Митрофанович Замятин; 9 March 1922 – 19 June 2019) was a Soviet ambassador and diplomat.

== Biography ==
He graduated from the Moscow Aviation Institute, and worked as a diplomat from 1946. He became an adviser to the Soviet delegation at the United Nations, and a permanent representative of the Soviet Union on the IAEA Board of Governors. From 1962 to 1970, he served in the Ministry of Foreign Affairs of the Soviet Union, becoming head of the press department. From 1970 to 1978, he was director general of TASS, the official news agency of the Soviet Union. He was Chairman of the International Information Department of the Central Committee of the Communist Party of the Soviet Union from 1978 to 1986. In 1986, he was appointed the Soviet ambassador to the United Kingdom. He was forced to resign his ambassadorship after his refusal to condemn the 1991 August coup against Mikhail Gorbachev.

== Awards ==
- Order of Lenin
- Order of the October Revolution
- Order of the Red Banner of Labour
- Order of Friendship of Peoples
- Jubilee Medal "In Commemoration of the 100th Anniversary of the Birth of Vladimir Ilyich Lenin"
- Medal "For the Victory over Germany in the Great Patriotic War 1941–1945"
- Jubilee Medal "Twenty Years of Victory in the Great Patriotic War 1941–1945"
- Jubilee Medal "Thirty Years of Victory in the Great Patriotic War 1941–1945"
- Jubilee Medal "Forty Years of Victory in the Great Patriotic War 1941–1945"
- Jubilee Medal "50 Years of Victory in the Great Patriotic War 1941–1945"
- Medal "For Strengthening of Brotherhood in Arms"
- Jubilee Medal "50 Years of the Armed Forces of the USSR"
- Jubilee Medal "60 Years of the Armed Forces of the USSR"
- Jubilee Medal "70 Years of the Armed Forces of the USSR"
- Lenin Prize
