= Abdudzhabar Abdurakhmanov =

Uzbek politician (1907–1975)

Chairman of the Council of Ministers of the Uzbek SSR
- In office 15 March 1946 – 21 August 1950
- Preceded by: Himself (as Chairman of the Council of People's Commissars)
- Succeeded by: Abdurrazak Mavlyanov

Chairman of the Council of People's Commissars of the Uzbek SSR
- In office 23 July 1938 – 15 March 1946
- Preceded by: Sultan Segizbayev
- Succeeded by: Himself (as Chairman of the Council of Ministers)

Personal details
- Born: 1907 Tashkent, Russian Turkestan
- Died: 3 October 1975 (aged 67–68)
- Party: CPSU

Abdudzhabar Abdudzhabarovich Abdurakhmanov (Russian: Абдурахманов Абдуджабар Абдуджабарович, Uzbek: Abdujabbor Abdurahmonov; 1907 – 3 October 1975) was a Soviet and Uzbek politician. He served as the head of government of the Uzbek SSR from 1938 to 1950, first as Chairman of the Council of People's Commissars and then as Chairman of the Council of Ministers.

== Biography ==
Abdurakhmanov was born in 1907 in Tashkent, Russian Turkestan, to a working class family. He was an apprentice spinner at a textile factory in Moscow from 1924 to 1925, then helped construct the Fergana textile factory in 1928, which was the first to be built in the Uzbek SSR. That same year, he became a member of the Communist Party of the Soviet Union (CPSU). Afterwards, he became involved in politics; starting in 1929, he sequentially served as Secretary of the Margilan City Committee, Secretary of the Fergana City Committee, Secretary of the Yangiyoʻl District Committee, Secretary of the Kokand City Committee, and Secretary of the Bukhara Regional Committee of the Communist Party of Uzbekistan.

Abdurakhmanov was appointed Chairman of the Council of People's Commissars of the Uzbek SSR (head of government) on 23 July 1938, with his title later being renamed to Chairman of the Council of Ministers in 1946. That year, he also became a member of the Supreme Soviet of the Soviet Union, a position he served in through 1954, and in 1939 he became a member of the Central Auditing Commission of the 18th Congress of the All-Union Communist Party (Bolsheviks), a title he held through 1952. He was also a deputy of the Supreme Soviet of the Uzbek Soviet Socialist Republic and served on the Central Committee of the Communist Party of Uzbekistan. Abdurakhmanov served 12 years as head of government of the Uzbek SSR. His obituary in the Sovet Oʻzbekistoni noted that in this role, "His organizational skills and unique talent were fully manifested ... He did a lot for the development of the republic's productive forces, for the mobilization of workers against the German-fascist invaders, and after the war for the people of the Uzbek SSR, for the restoration of the Uzbek economy."

Abdurakhmanov was removed as head of government of the Uzbek SSR on 21 August 1950. After this, he was transferred to Moscow. He served as Deputy Minister of State Farms of the USSR from 1951 to 1953, as Head of the Main Directorate of Karakul Sheep Breeding Farms of the Ministry of State Farms of the USSR from 1953 to 1954, and then as Chairman of the State Planning Committee of the Council of Ministers of the Uzbek SSR from 1954 to 1956. Abdurakhmanov worked as the Director of the Uzbek SSR pavilion at the All-Union Agricultural Exhibition in Moscow from 1956 to 1960. After this, he served as an economic advisor to the USSR Embassy in North Vietnam from 1960 to 1964. He later was permanent representative of the Uzbek SSR in Moscow.

Abdurakhmanov was a recipient of the Order of Lenin three times, "for outstanding achievements in agriculture, and especially for overfulfilling the cotton plan". He was also a recipient of the Order of the Red Banner of Labor and the Order of the Patriotic War, first degree. He died on 3 October 1975, from a long illness. After his death, he was described by the Sovet Oʻzbekistoni as someone who "devoted all his strength, knowledge and experience to selfless service to the Motherland and the people, performing the work assigned to him with a high sense of responsibility and honor. He was ... a kind-hearted person, a loyal friend and comrade."
