= WikiBilim =

Kazakh nonprofit organization

WikiBilim Public Foundation
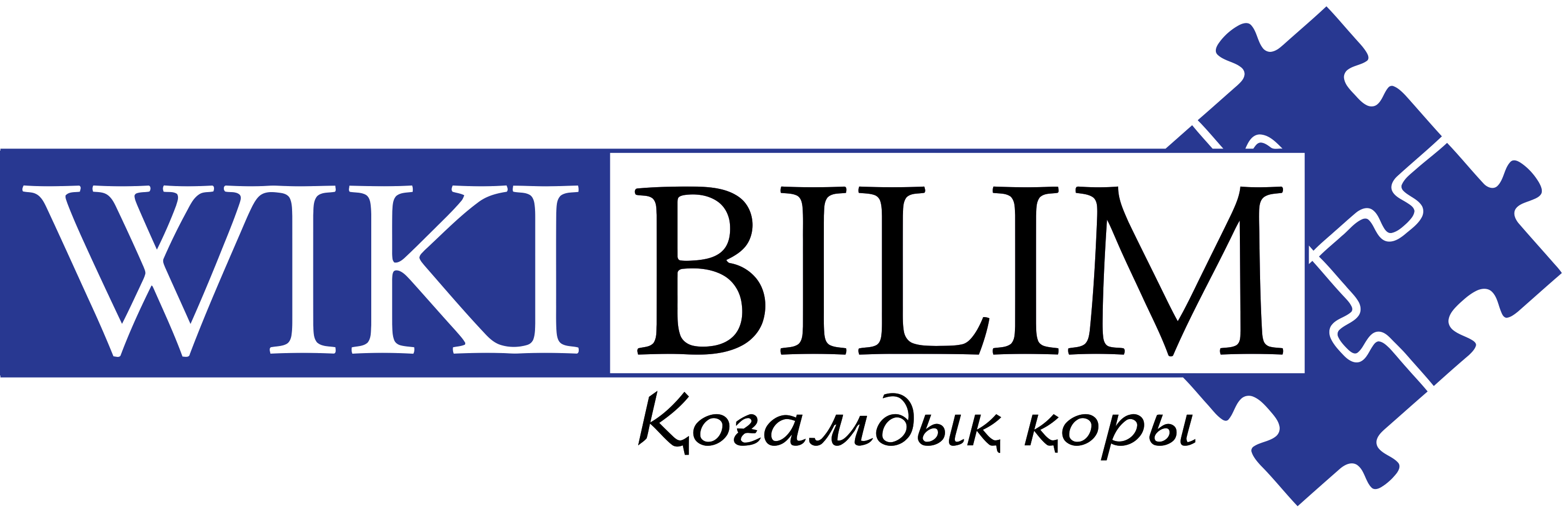
- Founded: 16 May 2011; 15 years ago
- Founder: Rauan Kenzhekhanuly, Timur Muktarov, Nartay Ashim
- Type: Accordance to Kazakhstan Republic Law
- Purpose: Education, Social Development, Kazakh Language, Digital content
- Location: Almaty, Kazakhstan
- Region served: Kazakhstan
- Method: Online projects, creating intellectual clubs, grants
- Owner: Public Foundation - individuals
- Key people: Rauan Kenzhekhanuly, Chair of the Board of Trustees
- Employees: 12
- Website: www.wikibilim.kz

WikiBilim Public Foundation is a non-profit organisation operating in the Republic of Kazakhstan. The organisation was established to develop and promote online educational content in the Kazakh language. 'Wiki' means content generated by users; 'Bilim' means knowledge.

== History ==
The organisation was founded as a non-profit public foundation by Rauan Kenzhekhanuly, Timur Muktarov, Nartay Ashim, and Marat Isbayev in May 2011. WikiBilim's initial project focused on the Kazakh Wikipedia and the development of its editor community.

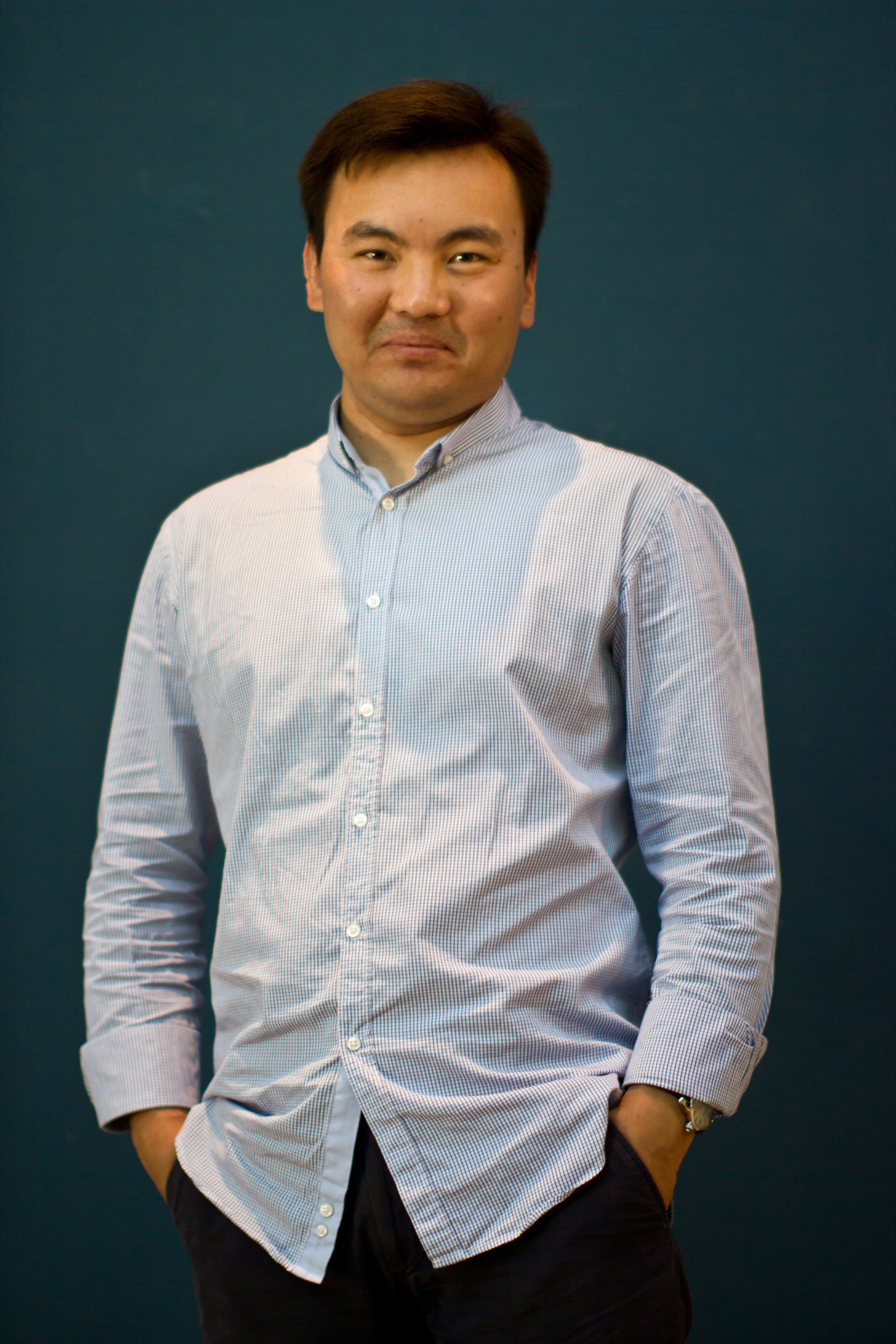
Rauan Kenzhekhanuly, head of the WikiBilim Foundation

WikiBilim began negotiations with the Wikimedia Foundation at the beginning of May 2011. On 16 May 2011, WikiBilim announced itself as a project dedicated to Wikipedia in Kazakhstan, during a press conference. The chairman of the Wikimedia Foundation Board, Ting Chen, came to support the Kazakh Wikipedia. Moreover, participating in the press conference were a member of the Kazakh Parliament, Murat Abenov, as well as the chair of the Kazakh National Encyclopedia, Bauyrzhan Zhaqyp, along with a leader of KazContent.

At the conference, Chen announced that the Wikimedia Foundation supported WikiBilim and appreciated its efforts to expand the Kazakh Wikipedia. The Kazakh National Encyclopedia officially confirmed the provision of all its material under a licence CC-BY-SA 3.0, which permits the publication of all the encyclopedia's materials on the Kazakh Wikipedia. Nokia Corporation announced its sponsorship of the Вики-бәйге contest, in which it would give 40 mobile phones to the best editors of the Kazakh Wikipedia. In June 2011, sophomore students from the International IT University volunteered as contributors to the Kazakh Wikipedia, helping to format and publish prepared materials on the platform.

In August 2011, at Wikimania 2011 in Haifa, Jimmy Wales presented Kenzhekhanuly with the Wikipedian of the Year award. Moreover, Wales announced his own grant to WikiBilim as a contribution to the development of the Kazakh Wikipedia. The Wikimedia Foundation has given the organisation a $16,600 grant for conducting a Turkic Wikimedia Conference in Almaty. Contributors to Wikipedia in the West have raised the question of whether the foundation and Wales should be supporting WikiBilim in light of the backing it has received from the Kazakh government, which has been responsible for closing down independent media outlets in what Human Rights Watch describes as a 'growing crackdown on free speech'.

On 14–17 September 2011, the WikiBilim Public Foundation was invited to take part in the Digital Communications Kazakhstan 2011 Exhibition, where it introduced its methods of recruiting young people for start-up projects.

On 16–18 September 2011, representatives of the WikiBilim Public Foundation attended the Creative Commons Global Summit conference in Warsaw, Poland. The purpose of this trip was to include Kazakhstan among the countries that work on the distribution of information under Creative Commons standards.

On 27 September 2011, WikiBilim organised a Wiki-seminar at the Kazakh National Pedagogical University for Women in Almaty, Kazakhstan.

On 28 September 2011, the Kazakh National Academy of Arts hosted a presentation about the WikiBilim Public Foundation.

In October 2011, WikiBilim conducted a training session and seminar at Nazarbayev University. The purpose of the seminar was to create a Wiki-Club with Wiki ambassadors on the university campus, and this club would focus on recruiting young people in Kazakhstan to improve the usage of the Kazakh national language, education, and science.

== Objectives ==
- Contribute to and support the development of Kazakh-language online content, education, culture, and innovative technologies.
- Develop the IT sphere in Kazakhstan in general.
- Organise educational projects for young people.
- Sponsor social projects.
- Modernise information and communication systems for Kazakh-language content.
- Contribute to the overall development of Kazakhstan's internet content.
- Develop improved communication for information in education.
- Organise contests, awards, and social gatherings for contributors of Kazakh-language content.
- Support the improvement of the systematisation of laws in Kazakhstan.

== Projects ==
WikiBilim is working on several different projects to promote its mission:

=== Kazakh Wikipedia ===
The Kazakh Wikipedia was the first project of the WikiBilim Public Fund, which was launched in June 2011. The purpose of the project was to improve the quality and quantity of the material, and to increase the number of active users on the Kazakh Wikipedia. The intention was also to create an intellectual community, where members could share their knowledge in the Kazakh language and, eventually, turn the community into an everyday hobby. The supporters of the project were the Samruk-Kazyna Welfare Fund, which provided 100 laptops for the 100 most active users, and Nokia Corporation, which supported the Вики-Бәйге contest, in which the forty best users on the Kazakh Wikipedia received Nokia phones. The Ministry of Information and Communication of the Republic of Kazakhstan helped with the organisation of events. The Kazakh National Encyclopedia provided its electronic version of its material. The International IT University provided its volunteer students to work on material for the Kazakh Wikipedia.

=== Creative Commons Kazakhstan ===
Adaptation of Creative Commons standards in Kazakhstan. This project targets open information sharing, providing a platform for people to easily and effectively share information and knowledge.

=== Open Library of Kazakhstan (www.kitap.kz) ===
On 17 September 2012, the WikiBilim Foundation presented the Open Library of Kazakhstan, www.kitap.kz, published under a Creative Commons BY-NC-ND licence. The library contains more than 3,500 books, 100 audiobooks, and 200 audio files.

=== Google Translate and the Kazakh language ===
In 2014, the WikiBilim Public Foundation implemented the 'Google Translate + Kazakh' project to include the Kazakh language in Google's global system.

== Funding ==
As of 2012, the Wikimedia Foundation had also offered a $16,000 grant to WikiBilim for conducting first Turkic Wikimedia Conference in Almaty.
