= Central Auditing Commission of the 19th Congress of the Communist Party of the Soviet Union =

This electoral term of the Central Auditing Commission was elected by the 19th Congress of the Communist Party of the Soviet Union in 1952, and was in session until the convocation of the 20th Congress in 1956.

== Composition ==
Members of the Central Auditing Commission of the 19th Congress of the Communist Party of the Soviet Union
Name	Cyrillic	18th CAC	20th CAC	Birth	Death	PM	Nationality	Gender	Ref.
Aleksey Alekseyev	Алексе́й Алексе́ев	New	Not	1911	?	?	Russian	Male	
Vasily Andreyev	Василий Андреев	New	Not	1906	1974	1929	Russian	Male	
Vasily Babich	Василий Бабич	New	Reelected	1912	1988	1931	Ukrainian	Male	
Valery Druzin	Валерий Друзин	New	Not	1903	1980	1944	Russian	Male	
Georgy Enyutin	Георгий Енютин	New	Not	1903	1969	1924	Russian	Male	
Alexander Gorkin	Александр Горкин	New	Reelected	1897	1988	1916	Russian	Male	
Grigory Grishko	Григорий Гришко	New	CC	1906	1959	1932	Ukrainian	Male	
Evgeny Gromov	Евгений Громов	New	CC	1909	1981	1932	Russian	Male	
Grigory Gromov	Григорий громов	CC	Reelected	1903	1973	1924	Russian	Male	
Konstantin Gubin	Губин Александрович	New	Reelected	1897	1979	1919	Russian	Male	
Grigory Kosyachenko	Григо́рий Косяче́нко	New	Reelected	1900	1983	1917	Ukrainian	Male	
Vladimir Kruzhkov	Кружков Семёнович	New	Not	1905	1991	1925	Ukrainian	Male	
Turabay Kulatov	Турабай Кулатов	Old	Reelected	1908	1984	1932	Kyrgyz	Male	
Zoya Mironova	Зоя Миронова	New	Reelected	1912	1991	1940	Russian	Female	
Pyotr Moskatov	Пётр Москатов	Old	Reelected	1894	1969	1917	Russian	Male	
Vasily Moskovsky	Василий Московский	New	Reelected	1904	1984	1928	Russian	Male	
Georgy Osipov	Георгий Осипов	New	Reelected	1906	1980	1927	Russian	Male	
Balysh Ovezov	Балы́ш Ове́зов	New	Reelected	1915	1975	1939	Turkmen	Male	
Nikolai Podgorny	Николай Подгорный	New	CC	1903	1983	1930	Ukrainian	Male	
Boris Podtserob	Борис Подцероб	New	Not	1910	1983	?	Belarusian	Male	
Pavel Prokkonen	Павел Прокконен	New	Reelected	1909	1979	1930	Finn	Male	
Dzhabar Rasulov	Джабар Расулов	New	Not	1913	1982	1939	Tajik	Male	
Gherasim Rudi	Гера́сим Рудь	New	CC	1907	1982	1939	Moldovan	Male	
Vladimir Semyonov	Владимир Семёнов	New	Reelected	1911	1992	1938	Russian	Male	
Nikolay Skvortsov	Николай Скворцов	CC	Not	1899	1974	1919	Russian	Male	
Arkady Sobenin	Аркадий Собенин	New	Not	1910	1972	1929	Russian	Male	
Alexey Spiridonov	Алексей Спиридонов	New	Reelected	1909	1988	1929	Russian	Male	
Aleksandr Struev	Алекса́ндр Стру́ев	New	CC	1906	1991	1927	Russian	Male	
Alexey Surkov	Сурков Александрович	New	CC	1899	1983	1925	Russian	Male	
Mikhail Suyetin	Михаил Суетин	New	Reelected	1906	1986	1925	Russian	Male	
Mikhail Tarasov	Сурков Александрович	New	CC	1899	1970	1924	Russian	Male	
Stepan Tarasov	Степа́н Тара́сов	Old	Died	1893	1955	1915	Russian	Male	
Elena Tretyakova	Зоя Миронова	New	Not	1908	?	?	Russian	Female	
Aleksandr Tvardovsky	Алекса́ндр Твардо́вский	New	Not	1910	1971	1940	Russian	Male	
Mir Teymur Yagubov	Мир Тејмур Яку́бов	New	Not	1904	1970	1927	Azerbaijani	Male	
Vasily Zakurdayev	Василий Закурдаев	New	CC	1903	1974	1927	Russian	Male	
Vasily Zinchenko	Василий Зинченко	New	Not	1910	1985	?	Ukrainian	Male	
