= Central Auditing Commission of the 18th Congress of the All-Union Communist Party (Bolsheviks) =

This electoral term of the Central Auditing Commission was elected by the 18th Congress of the All-Union Communist Party (Bolsheviks) in 1939, and was in session until the convocation of the 19th Congress in 1952.

== Composition ==
Members of the Central Auditing Commission of the 18th Congress of the All-Union Communist Party (Bolsheviks)
Name	Cyrillic	17th CAC	18th Con.	19th CAC	Birth	Death	PM	Ethnicity	Gender	Ref.
Abdudzhabar Abdurakhmanov	Абдурахма́нов Абдуджаба́рович	New	Renewed	Not	1907	1975	1928	Uzbek	Male	
Afanasy Andrienko	Афанасий Андриенко	New	Removed	—	1907	1942	1928	Ukrainian	Male	
Ivan Anoshin	Иван Аношин	New	Renewed	Not	1904	1991	1926	Russian	Male	
Viktor Bochkov	Ви́ктор Бочко́в	—	New	Not	1900	1981	1919	Belarusian	Male	
Pyotr Borodin	Пётр Бородин	—	New	Not	1905	1986	1926	Russian	Male	
Vasily Boytsov	Васи́лий Бойцо́в	New	Renewed	Not	1907	1980	1925	Russian	Male	
Vladimir Bulatov	Владимир Булатов	New	Renewed	Not	1910	1999	1925	Russian	Male	
Yakov Chubin	Я́ков Чу́бин	New	Removed	—	1893	1956	1915	Belarusian	Male	
Vasily Denisenko	Василий Денисенко	New	Removed	—	1895	1945	1927	Russian	Male	
Semyon Dukelsky	Семён Дукельский	New	Renewed	Not	1892	1960	1917	Russian	Male	
Filipp Golikov	Фили́пп Го́ликов	—	New	Not	1900	1980	1918	Russian	Male	
Nadezhda Grekova	Надежда Грекова	New	Renewed	Not	1910	2001	1932	Belarusian	Female	
Leonid Grischuk	Леонид Грищук	—	New	Not	1906	1960	1930	Ukrainian	Male	
Teymur Guliyev	Теймур Кулиев	New	Renewed	Not	1888	1965	1920	Azerbaijani	Male	
Semyon Ignatiev	Семён Дукельский	New	Renewed	Not	1904	1983	1926	Russian	Male	
Nikita Izotov	Никита Изотов	New	Renewed	Died	1902	1951	1936	Russian	Male	
Alexander Kabanov	Александр Кабанов	New	Renewed	Not	1899	1975	1924	Russian	Male	
Mikhail Kanunnikov	Михаил Канунников	New	Renewed	Not	1902	1984	1926	Russian	Male	
Aitbay Khudaibergenov	Аитбай Худайбергенов	New	Renewed	Not	1909	1995	1929	Turkmen	Male	
Vasily Kiselev	Василий Киселёв	New	Renewed	Not	1907	1986	1929	Russian	Male	
Kuzma Kiselyov	Кузьма Киселёв	New	Removed	—	1903	1977	1923	Belarusian	Male	
Pyotr Krivonos	Пётр Кривонос	New	Renewed	Not	1910	1980	1929	Ukrainian	Male	
Mikhail Kudinov	Михаил Кудинов	—	New	Not	1904	1975	1925	Ukrainian	Male	
Aleksandr Kudryavtsev	Александр Кудрявцев	New	Renewed	Not	1906	1970	1930	Russian	Male	
Turabay Kulatov	Турабай Кулатов	New	Renewed	Reelected	1908	1984	1932	Kyrgyz	Male	
Mamadali Kurbanov	Мамадали Курбанов	New	Renewed	Not	1905	1976	1930	Tajik	Male	
Fedor Kuznetsov	Фёдор Кузнецов	New	Renewed	Not	1904	1979	1926	Russian	Male	
Ivan Kuznetsov	Иван Кузнецов	New	Renewed	Not	1897	1983	1918	Russian	Male	
Mikhail Kvasov	Михаил Квасов	New	Removed	—	1902	1984	1926	Ukrainian	Male	
Pyotr Lavrentyev	Пётр Лаврентьев	New	Renewed	Not	?	?	1925	Russian	Male	
Nikolay Linkun	Николай Линкун	New	Renewed	Not	1904	1977	1925	Russian	Male	
Pavel Lobanov	Павел Лобанов	New	Renewed	Not	1902	1984	1927	Russian	Male	
Sergey Lukin	Сергей Лукин	New	Renewed	Died	1894	1948	1925	Russian	Male	
Aleksandr Lyubimov	Александр Любимов	New	Renewed	Not	1898	1967	1924	Russian	Male	
Aleksey Melnikov	Алексей Ме́льников	New	Renewed	Not	1900	1967	1919	Russian	Male	
Olga Mishakova	Ольга Мишакова	New	Renewed	Not	1906	1980	1937	Russian	Female	
Gavriil Mishchenko	Гавриил Мищенко	New	Renewed	Not	1904	1966	1925	Ukrainian	Male	
Vasily Molokov	Михаил Кудинов	—	New	Not	1895	1982	1925	Russian	Male	
Pyotr Moskatov	Пётр Москатов	New	Renewed	Reelected	1894	1969	1917	Russian	Male	
Ivan Murugov	Ива́н Муру́гов	New	Sentenced	—	1897	1941	1917	Russian	Male	
Georgy Ogorodnikov	Георгий Огородников	New	Renewed	Not	1901	1970	1923	Russian	Male	
Filipp Oktyabrsky	Фили́пп Октя́брьский	—	New	Not	1899	1969	1919	Russian	Male	
Aleksandr Panyushkin	Алекса́ндр Па́нюшкин	—	New	Not	1905	1974	1927	Russian	Male	
Ivan Papanin	Ива́н Папа́нин	—	New	Not	1894	1986	1938	Russian	Male	
Ivan Peresypkin	Ива́н Пересы́пкин	—	New	Not	1904	1978	1925	Russian	Male	
Aram Piruzyan	Арам Пирузян	New	Renewed	Not	1907	1996	1929	Armenian	Male	
Markian Popov	Маркиа́н Попо́в	—	New	Not	1902	1969	1921	Russian	Male	
Dmitri Protopopov	Дми́трий Протопо́пов	New	Renewed	Not	1897	1986	1917	Russian	Male	
Aleksey Sadzhaya	Алексей Саджая	New	Renewed	WWII	1898	1942	1919	Russian	Male	
Nikolay Shatalin	Никола́й Шата́лин	New	Renewed	Not	1904	1984	1925	Russian	Male	
Grigory Silkin	Григорий Силкин	New	Removed	—	1898	1964	1929	Russian	Male	
Semyon Skrynnikov	Семён Скрынников	New	Removed	—	1898	1969	1917	Russian	Male	
Pavel Smirnov	Павел Смирнов	New	Renewed	Not	1894	1954	1917	Russian	Male	
Ion Stepanenko	Ион Степаненко	New	Renewed	Not	1895	1965	1918	Russian	Male	
Mikhail Suslov	Михаи́л Су́слов	New	Transferred	—	1902	1982	1921	Russian	Male	
Stepan Tarasov	Степа́н Тара́сов	New	Renewed	Reelected	1893	1955	1915	Russian	Male	
Vladimir Tributs	Влади́мир Три́буц	—	New	Not	1900	1977	1928	Russian	Male	
Lavrentiy Tsanava	Лавре́нтий Цана́ва	New	Renewed	Not	1900	1955	1920	Georgian	Male	
Nurtas Undasynov	Нуртас Ундасынов	New	Renewed	Not	1904	1989	1926	Kazakh	Male	
Aleksey Vagov	Алексе́й Ва́гов	New	Renewed	Not	1905	1971	1925	Russian	Male	
Mikhail Vladimirsky	Михаил Владимирский	Old	Renewed	Died	1874	1951	1898	Russian	Male	
Aleksei Volkov	Алексе́й Ва́гов	New	Removed	—	1889	1942	1915	Russian	Male	
