= Kazakh Wikipedia =

Kazakh-language edition of Wikipedia

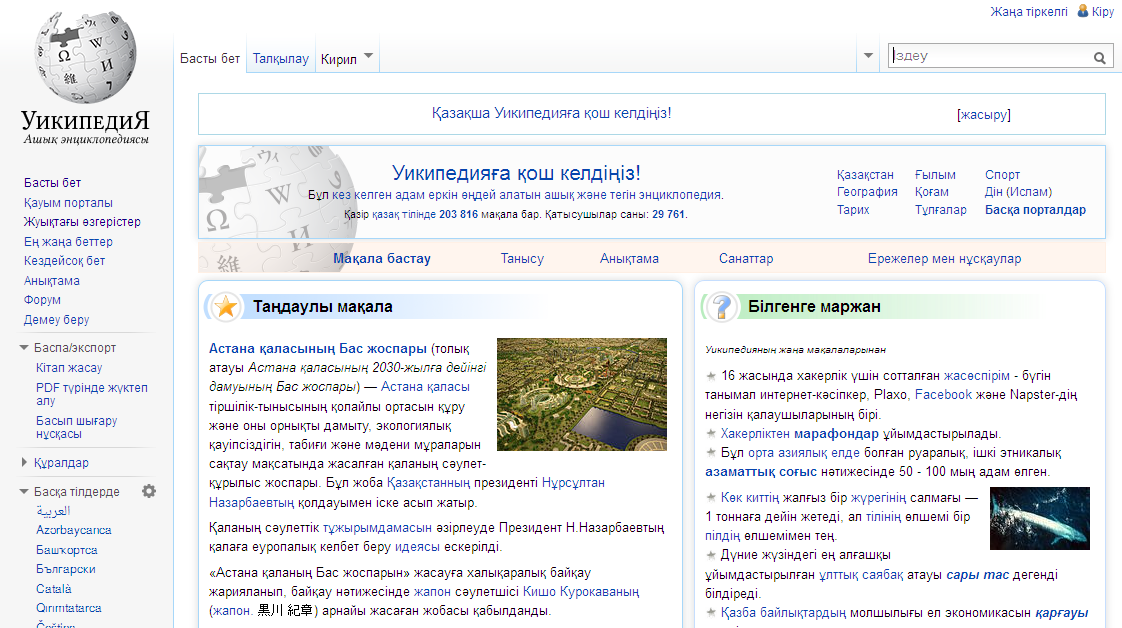
- Screenshot
- Website type: Internet encyclopedia project
- Available in: Kazakh
- Headquarters: Miami, Florida
- Owner: Wikimedia Foundation
- Creator: Kazakh wiki community
- Website: kk.wikipedia.org
- Commercial: No
- Registration: Optional
- Launched: 3 June 2002; 24 years ago
- Content license: Creative Commons Attribution/ Share-Alike 4.0 (most text also dual-licensed under GFDL); Media licensing varies

The Kazakh Wikipedia (Kazakh: Қазақша Уикипедия, romanized: Qazaqşa Uikipedia) is the Kazakh language edition of the free online encyclopedia Wikipedia, founded on 3 June 2002.

== History ==
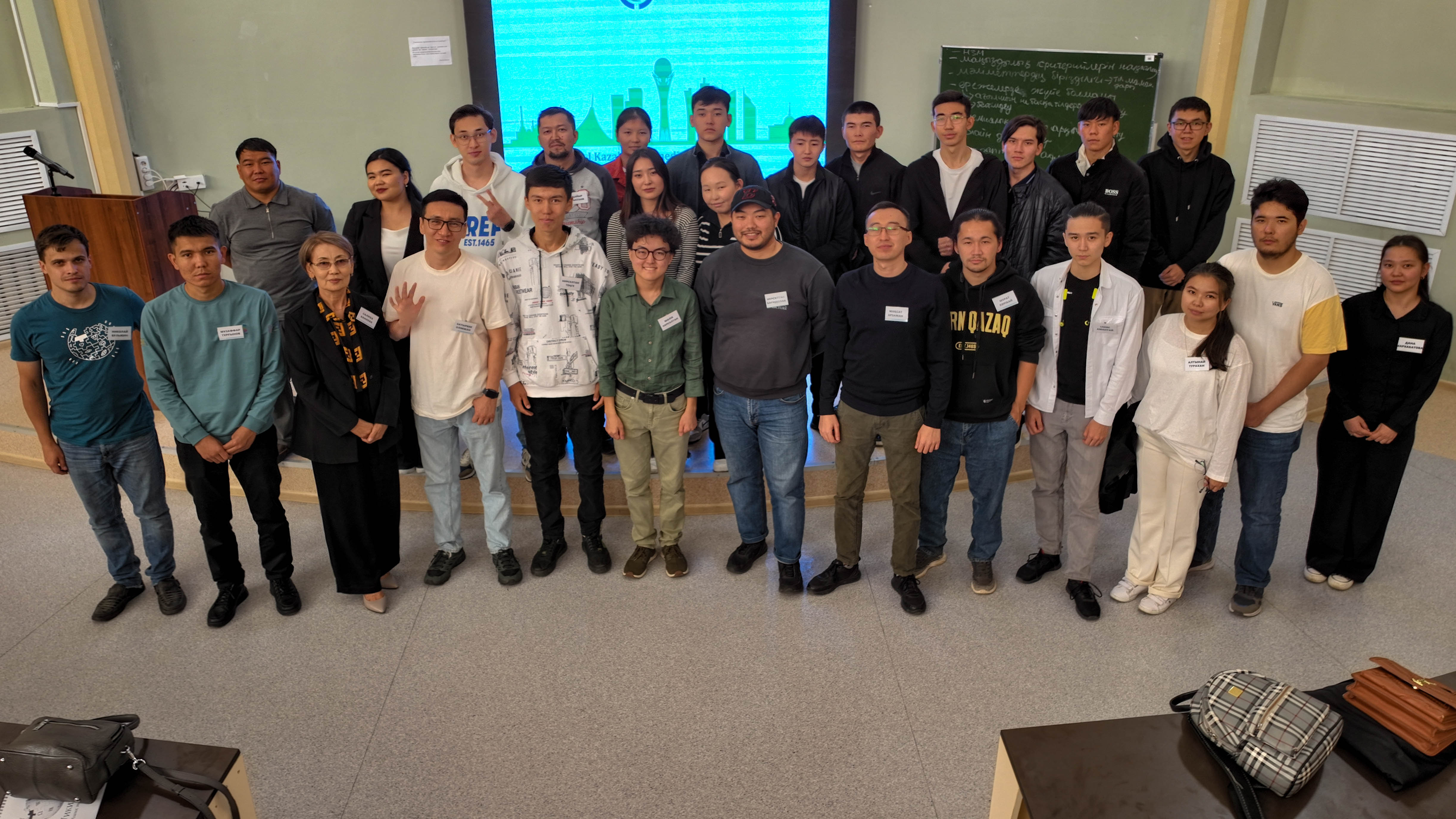
Collective photo of participants of Kazakh Wiki-conference 2023

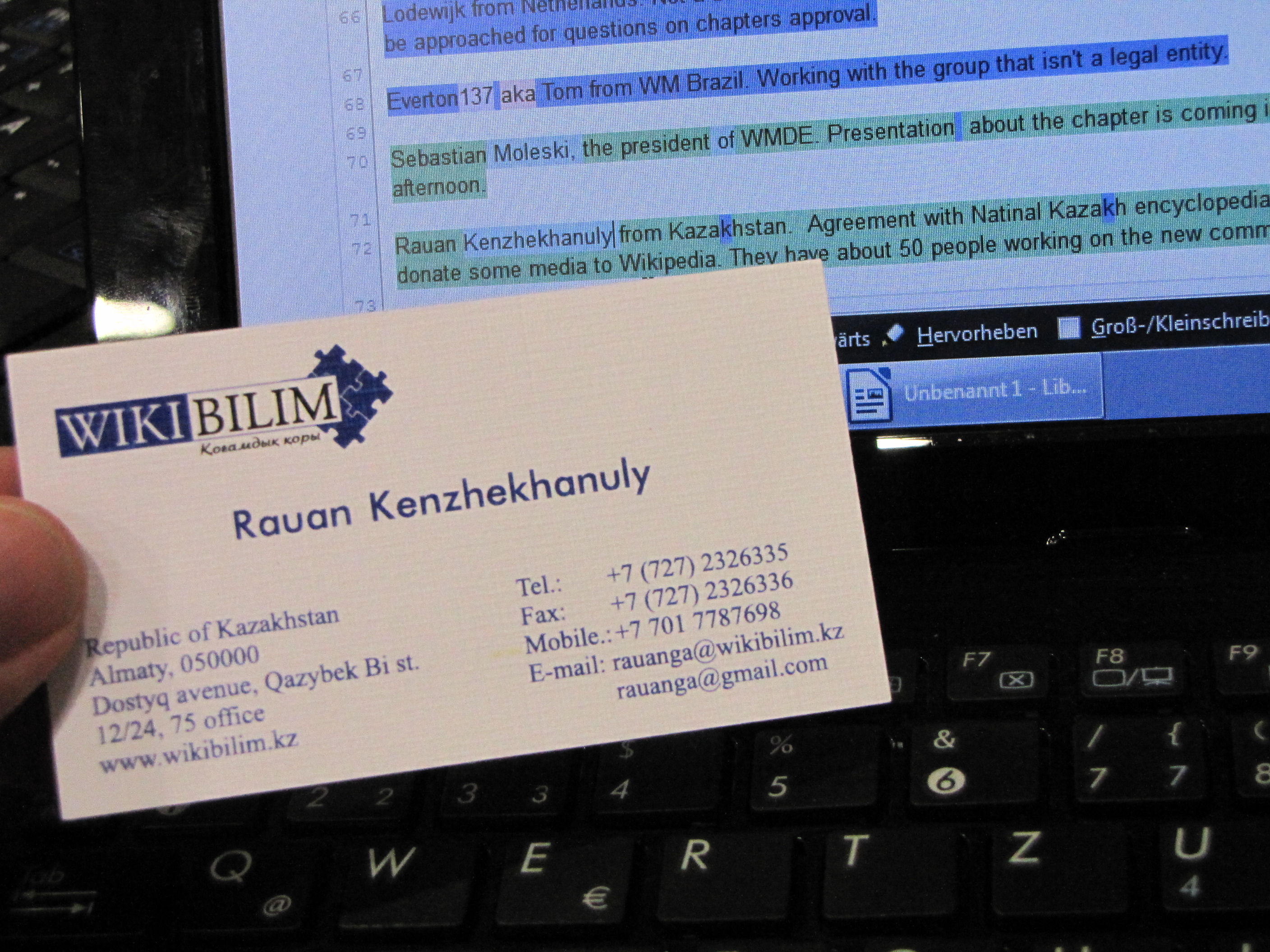
WikiBilim business card featuring the name of Rauan Kenzhekhanuly

The Kazakh Wikipedia was launched in June 2002. It experienced exceptionally rapid growth in 2011, expanding from 7,000 articles to over 100,000 in less than a year, largely as a result of the incorporation of material from the Kazakh Encyclopedia, which had been released under a Creative Commons Attribution Share-Alike Licence (CC BY-SA). This rapid expansion was initiated by the non-profit Wikibilim Foundation. The Samruk Kazyna Foundation, Kazakhstan's sovereign oil wealth fund, sponsored the project, allocating 30 million tenge in 2011 for paid editing, digitisation, and the transfer of authors' rights. At the Wikimania 2011 conference, the president of WikiBilim, Rauan Kenzhekhanuly, was awarded the Wikipedian of the Year award by Wikipedia co-founder Jimmy Wales for his work on the expansion of the Kazakh Wikipedia.

In April 2012, Tengrinews.kz reported that 'in 2011, the Samruk Kazyna sovereign wealth fund allocated a total of $204,000 to develop the Kazakh-language Wikipedia. This year, another $136,000 will be earmarked', citing the fund's press service. Wales expressed his gratitude to the Kazakh government for its support of the Kazakh Wikipedia at Wikimania 2012.

The Kazakh Wikipedia was previously viewable in three different scripts: Cyrillic, Latin, and Arabic. In late 2023, the MediaWiki language conversion for Kazakh was removed. On 26 October 2011, it passed the 100,000-article threshold, and by early 2013 it contained just over 200,000 articles.

On 2–3 September 2023, the first Kazakh Wiki Conference was held at the Eurasian National University in Astana.

== Features ==
The Kazakh Wikipedia used ZhengZhu's character mapping programme to convert between Cyrillic, Latin, and Arabic scripts, while its Latin script utilised Kazinform's own romanisation system.

The character conversion system was removed from the Kazakh Wikipedia in 2023.

== Controversies ==
Questions have been asked about WikiBilim's closeness to the Kazakh government, given that WikiBilim president Rauan Kenzhekhanuly had a long prior career as a Kazakh government official, and the government has been widely criticised for its crackdown on free speech. Wikipedia co-founder Jimmy Wales's friendship with former British Prime Minister Tony Blair, who advises the Kazakh government, has also come under scrutiny, as has the neutrality of the Kazakh Wikipedia's content, much of which is a reproduction of the state-published national encyclopedia.

In 2015, Jimmy Wales stated on Reddit that at the time he gave Kenzhekhanuly the inaugural Wikipedian of the Year award, he had been unaware of Kenzhekhanuly's prior positions as first secretary at Kazakhstan's embassy in Moscow and as an adviser to the governor of Kazakhstan's Mangystau region; by 2015, Kenzhekhanuly had gone on to become deputy governor of Kazakhstan's Kyzylorda region and founding director of the Eurasian Council on Foreign Affairs, a think-tank funded by the Kazakh government.

== Statistics ==
As of October 2026, the Kazakh Wikipedia has about 246,000 articles. The overwhelming majority of its readers originate from Kazakhstan.

As of April 2013, the Kazakh Wikipedia's number of articles accounted for approximately 14% of all articles written in a Turkic language, making it the second largest edition in the family after Turkish, which accounted for 28% of all Turkic articles.

Origin of views (2012/03 - 2013/02) Source
Kazakhstan	94.7%
Other	5.3%

== Books contributed to the Kazakh Wikipedia ==
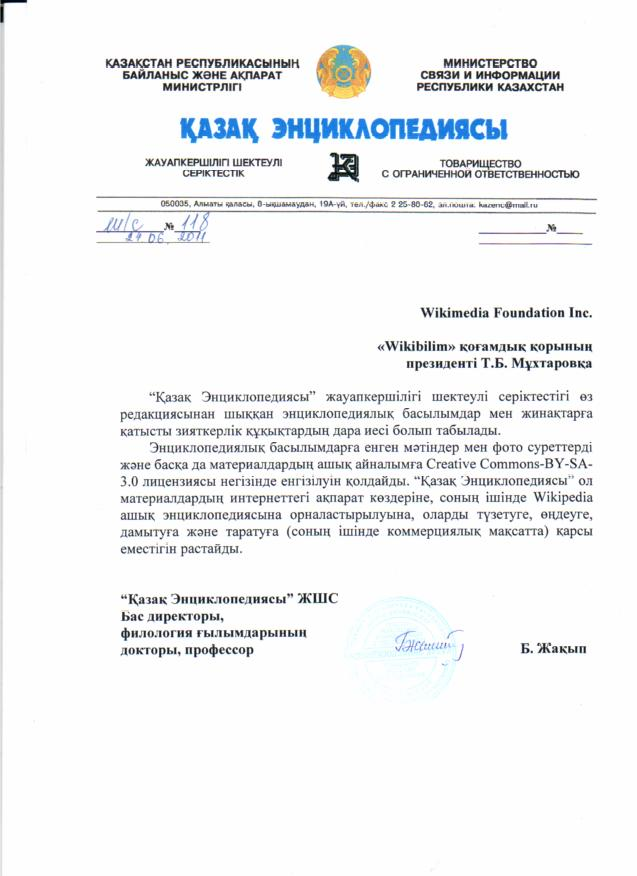
A letter from the Kazakh Encyclopedia granting permission to publish its materials under the CC BY-SA licence

- Kazakhstan: National Encyclopedia / Editor-in-Chief Ä. Nysanbaev – Almaty: Editorial Board of the Kazakh Encyclopedia, 1998. ISBN 978-5-89800-123-0 – 50,000 articles.
- Kazakh Culture: An Encyclopedic Reference. Almaty: "Aruna Ltd.", 2005. ISBN 978-9965-26-095-7
- Kazakh Television: An Encyclopedia. Almaty: "QazAqparat", 2009. Vol. 1. ISBN 978-601-03-0070-5
- The Traditional System of Kazakh Ethnographic Categories, Concepts and Names: An Encyclopedia. Almaty: DPS, 2011. ISBN 978-601-7026-17-2
- Kazakhstan – A Land of Athletes: An Encyclopedic Reference. Almaty: "Sözdik-Slovar". ISBN 978-9965-822-57-5
- Dictionary of Finance and Economics. Almaty: Institute of Economics of the Ministry of Education and Science of the Republic of Kazakhstan; "Ziyatker" LLP, 2007. ISBN 978-601-215-003-2
- Islam: An Encyclopedic Reference. Almaty: "Aruna Ltd.", 2010. ISBN 978-9965-26-322-4
- Taraz Encyclopedia.
- Economic and Social Geography of Kazakhstan: A Textbook for the 9th Grade of General Education Schools / V. Usikov, T. Kazanovskaya, A. Usikova, G. Zöbenova. 2nd ed., revised. Almaty: Atamūra, 2009. ISBN 978-9965-34-934-8
- Russian–Kazakh Explanatory Dictionary: Science Studies. General editorship supervised by E. Aryn, Doctor of Pedagogical Sciences, Professor – Pavlodar: ECO SF, 2006. ISBN 978-9965-808-78-4
- Tūrsyn Q., Nūsqabaiūly J. Dictionary of Television: A Reference for Television Journalists: A Study Guide. Almaty: "Bilim", 2001. ISBN 978-9965-09-033-2
- Sectoral Scientific Explanatory Dictionary of Kazakh Terminology: Water Management. Almaty: Mektep, 2002.
- Encyclopedia of Science of the Republic of Kazakhstan.
- Sectoral Scientific Explanatory Dictionary of Kazakh Terminology: Geology / Scientific supervisor of the series of explanatory dictionaries A. Q. Qūsaiynov, Doctor of Pedagogical Sciences, Professor, Laureate of the State Prize of the Republic of Kazakhstan – Almaty: "Mektep" JSC, 2003. ISBN 978-5-7667-8188-2, ISBN 978-9965-16-512-2
- Russian–Kazakh Explanatory Dictionary of Pulmonology Terms. Almaty: Ana tili, 1996. ISBN 978-5-630-00473-4
- Qanysh Satbaev: An Encyclopedia / Editor-in-Chief B.Ö. Jaqyp – Almaty: Kazakh Encyclopedia, 2011. ISBN 978-9965-893-74-2
- Dictionary of Geological Terms. N. Seitov, A. Abdulin. Almaty: Qazaqstan, 1996. ISBN 978-5-615-01738-4
- Mukhtar Auezov: An Encyclopedia. Almaty: Atamūra, 2011. ISBN 978-601-282-175-8
- Five Hundred and Five Words. Almaty: Rauan, 1994. ISBN 978-5-625-02459-4
- Russian–Kazakh Explanatory Dictionary of Dentistry Terms. Almaty: Qazaqstan, 1991. ISBN 978-5-615-00789-7
- Russian–Latin–Kazakh Explanatory Dictionary of Pathological Anatomy Terms. Aqtöbe. ISBN 978-9965-437-40-3
- Explanatory Dictionary of Biomorphology Terms. Almaty: "Sözdik-Slovar", 2009. ISBN 978-9965-822-54-4
- Sectoral Scientific Explanatory Dictionary of Kazakh Terminology: Informatics and Computer Technology / Scientific supervisor A. Q. Qūsaiynov – Almaty: "Mektep" JSC, 2002. ISBN 978-5-7667-8284-1
- Kazakh Language: An Encyclopedia. Almaty: Ministry of Education, Culture and Health of the Republic of Kazakhstan; Kazakhstan Development Institute, 1998. ISBN 978-5-7667-2616-6
- Russian–Kazakh Explanatory Dictionary of Petroleum and Gas Geology Terms. General editorship by T. N. Jūmağaliev and B. M. Kuandyqov, Honoured Oil Geologists of Kazakhstan, 2000.
- Kazakh–Russian Dictionary of Banking Terms and Concepts / Ğ. Seitqasymov, B. Beisenğaliev, J. Bekbolatūly – Almaty: Ekonomika, 2006. ISBN 978-9965-783-20-3
- Rakhimbekova, Z. M. English–Russian–Kazakh Explanatory Dictionary of Materials Mechanics Terms. ISBN 978-9965-769-67-2
- Russian–Kazakh General Explanatory Dictionary: Transport / Professor E. Aryn – Pavlodar: "ECO" SF, 2006.
- Russian–Kazakh Explanatory Geographical Dictionary. Edited by Academician of the Kazakh SSR Academy of Sciences, Prof. S. K. Kenesbaev and Candidate of Philological Sciences A. A. Abdrakhmanov. Alma-Ata: "Nauka", 1966. (Academy of Sciences of the Kazakh SSR, Institute...)
- Shañyraq: A Household Encyclopedia. Almaty: Editorial Board of the Kazakh Soviet Encyclopedia, 1990. ISBN 978-5-89800-008-0
- Qarağandy: Encyclopedia of Qarağandy Region. Almaty: Atamūra, 2006. ISBN 978-9965-34-515-9

== Gallery ==
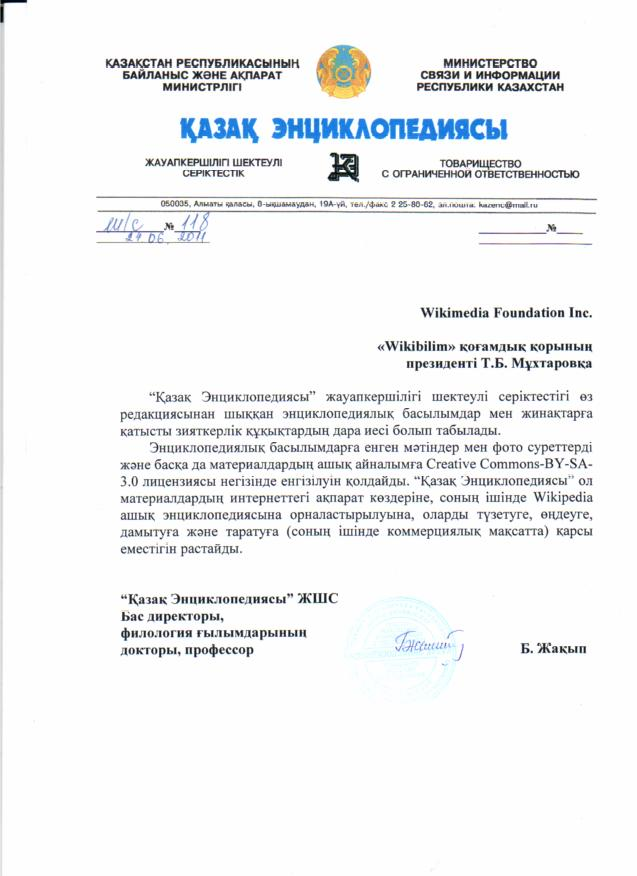
The letter from the Kazakh Encyclopedia stating the release of its materials under a CC BY-SA license

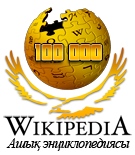
The Kazakh Wikipedia's 100K commemorative logo (Fall 2011)

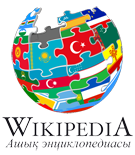
Kazakh Wikipedia logo at the time of the Turkic Wikimedia Conference (April 2012)

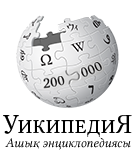
The Kazakh Wikipedia's 200K commemorative logo (Nov 2012)

== Sources ==
- Lih, Andrew. The Wikipedia Revolution: How a Bunch of Nobodies Created the World's Greatest Encyclopedia. Hyperion, New York City. 2009. First Edition. ISBN 978-1-4013-0371-6 (alkaline paper).
