= Aram Piruzyan =

Soviet Armenian politician (1907–1996)

- Արամ Փիրուզյան

Chairman of the Council of People's Commissars of the Armenian SSR
- In office 23 November 1937 – October 1943
- Preceded by: Mushegh Danelyan
- Succeeded by: Aghasi Sargsyan

Personal details
- Born: 10 February 1907 Baku, Russian Empire
- Died: 2 October 1996 (aged 89) Yerevan, Armenia
- Party: CPSU
- Profession: Politician

Aram Sergeyi Piruzyan (Armenian: Արամ Սերգեյի Փիրուզյան; 10 February 1907 – 2 October 1996) was a Soviet and Armenian politician who served as the Chairman of the Council of People's Commissars of the Armenian SSR from November 1937 to October 1943.

== Biography ==
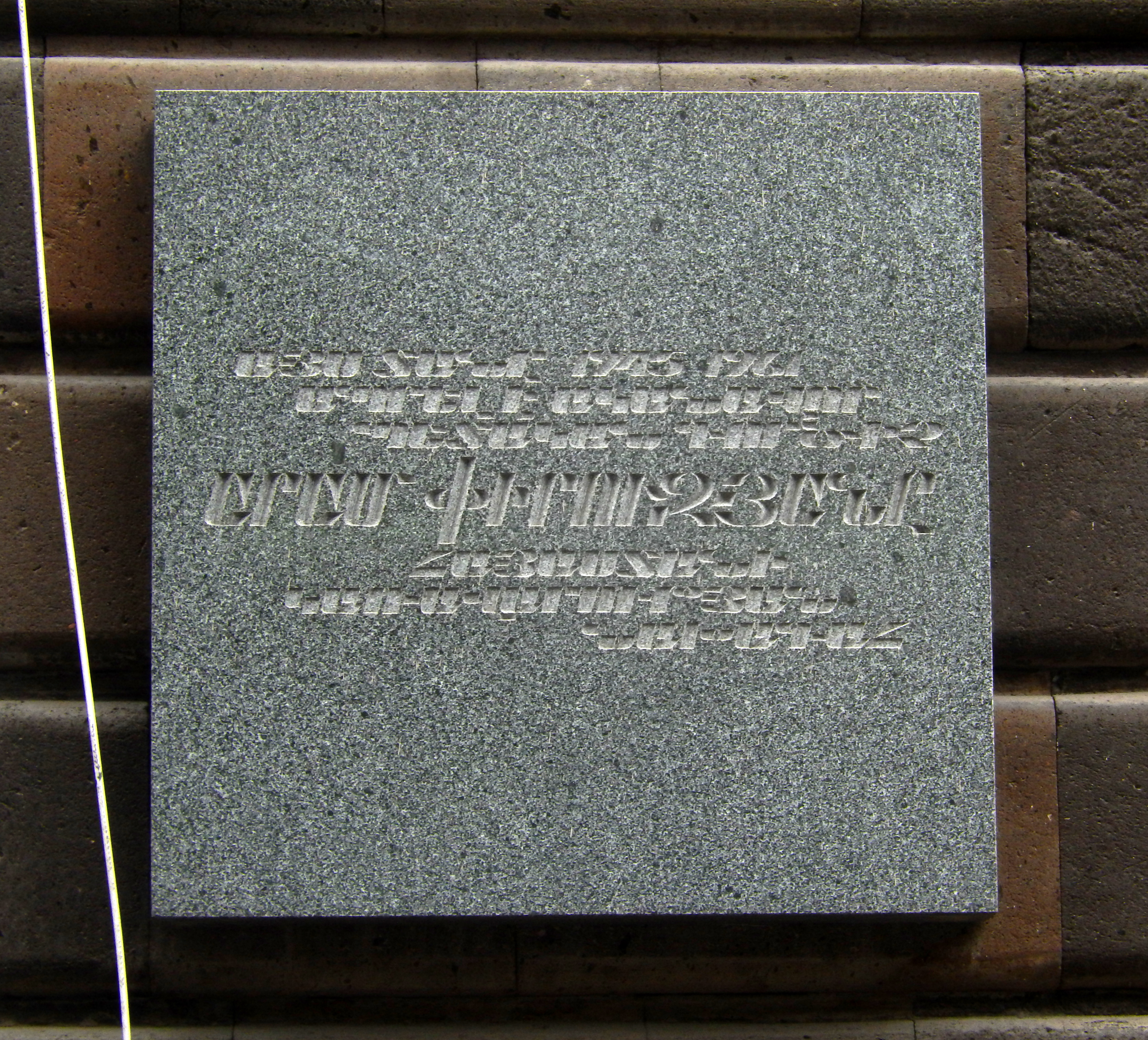
A memorial plaque to Piruzyan in Yerevan

Piruzyan was born on 10 February 1907 in Baku, then in Russian Transcaucasia, to a family with roots in the historical Lori region of Armenia. His father, Sergey, was a revolutionary who worked at a copper smelting plant and was killed during the September Days massacre. In 1929, he joined the Communist Party of the Soviet Union (CPSU). He graduated from the Sverdlovsk Industrial Academy of Non-Ferrous Metals in 1935 and later from the Higher Party School in 1945. Piruzyan was a Candidate of Economic Sciences.

Starting in 1918, Piruzyan worked in Alaverdi at a copper smelting plant. He rose from being an apprentice fitter to eventually becoming the plant's director. Also active in politics, he was appointed the head of the industry and transport department of the Central Committee of the Communist Party of the Soviet Union in 1937. On 23 November 1937, he became Chairman of the Council of People's Commissars of the Armenian SSR, a position he held through 1943, when he was succeeded by Aghasi Sargsyan. He participated in the 18th Congress of the CPSU in 1938 and served as a member of the Central Auditing Commission of the 18th Congress of the All-Union Communist Party from 1939 to 1952. In his tenure as Chairman of the Council of People's Commissars, the Eastern Front of World War II, known in the Soviet Union as the Great Patriotic War, broke out. Piruzyan's top priority was assisting in the production of military products, while he also oversaw the production of agricultural products which were sent to the front. During this time, the Armenian SSR government began using the slogan, "Everything for the front! Everything for victory!"

Piruzyan was named deputy chairman of the People's Commissariat of the Armenian SSR and permanent representative of the People's Commissariat of the Armenian SSR under the USSR Government in 1943. He served as the Armenian Minister of Local Industry and deputy chairman of the Council of Ministers from 1945 to 1948. In 1948, he became vice chairman of the Council of Ministers. Piruzyan was a member of the 19th Congress of the Communist Party of the Soviet Union which took place in 1952. He became Minister of Food Industry of the Armenian SSR in 1952, and Minister of the Light, Food, Meat, Dairy and Fish Industry of the Armenian SSR in 1955. He was appointed Minister of Trade in 1957, a position he served in until 1961. He was named the USSR trade representative in Greece in 1964. Piruzyan then became Deputy Chairman of the Technical Council of the USSR Ministry of Food Industry, as well as a member of the Scientific Council of the Main Committee for Science and Technology of the USSR Council of Ministers, in 1967.

Piruzyan received the Order of Lenin in 1940, "for achievements in the development of industry and agriculture". He also was a recipient of the Order of the Patriotic War, first degree, the Order of the Red Banner of Labor and the Order of the Badge of Honour. At the suggestion of Anastas Mikoyan, who oversaw the publication of The Book of Tasty and Healthy Food and later served as Chairman of the Presidium of the Supreme Soviet, Piruzyan wrote a book on Armenian cuisine, Armenian Cooking (Армянская кулинария), published in 1960, which achieved wide popularity in the Soviet Union. Piruzyan later claimed that his book was popular enough that Mikoyan asked for copies to give to Fidel Castro and other Cuban leaders.

In later years, Piruzyan also wrote several autobiographical works, including The Life of the Country is My Fate (Жизнь страны – судьба моя, published in 1995) and Food Industry: Years and People (Пищевая индустрия. Годы, люди, published posthumously in 1999). He was married to Evgenia Melik-Alakhverdova-Piruzyan, and was the father of the scientist Lev Piruzyan. He died on 2 October 1996 in Yerevan, Armenia, at the age of 89.

== Selected works ==
- Piruzyan, Aram S. (1960). Армянская кулинария (PDF) (in Russian). Moscow: Gostorgizdat.
- Piruzyan, Aram S. (1963). Հայկական խոհանոց (in Armenian). Yerevan: Haypethrat.
- Piruzyan, Aram S. (1989). Размышления о пройденном пути (in Russian). Yerevan: Hayastan.
- Piruzyan, Aram S. (1994). О хлебе насущном. Историко-экономические очерки, воспоминания (in Russian). Moscow: Nauka.
- Piruzyan, Aram S. (1995). Жизнь страны – судьба моя. К 50-летию Победы в Великой Отечественной войне (in Russian). Moscow: Nauka. ISBN 9785020122291.
- Piruzyan, Aram S. (1999). Пищевая индустрия. Годы, люди (in Russian). Moscow: Nauka. ISBN 9785020108479.
