= Rauan Kenzhekhanuly =

Kazakh entrepreneur and NGO activist (born 1979)

Rauan Kenjehanūly
- Рауан Кенжеханұлы
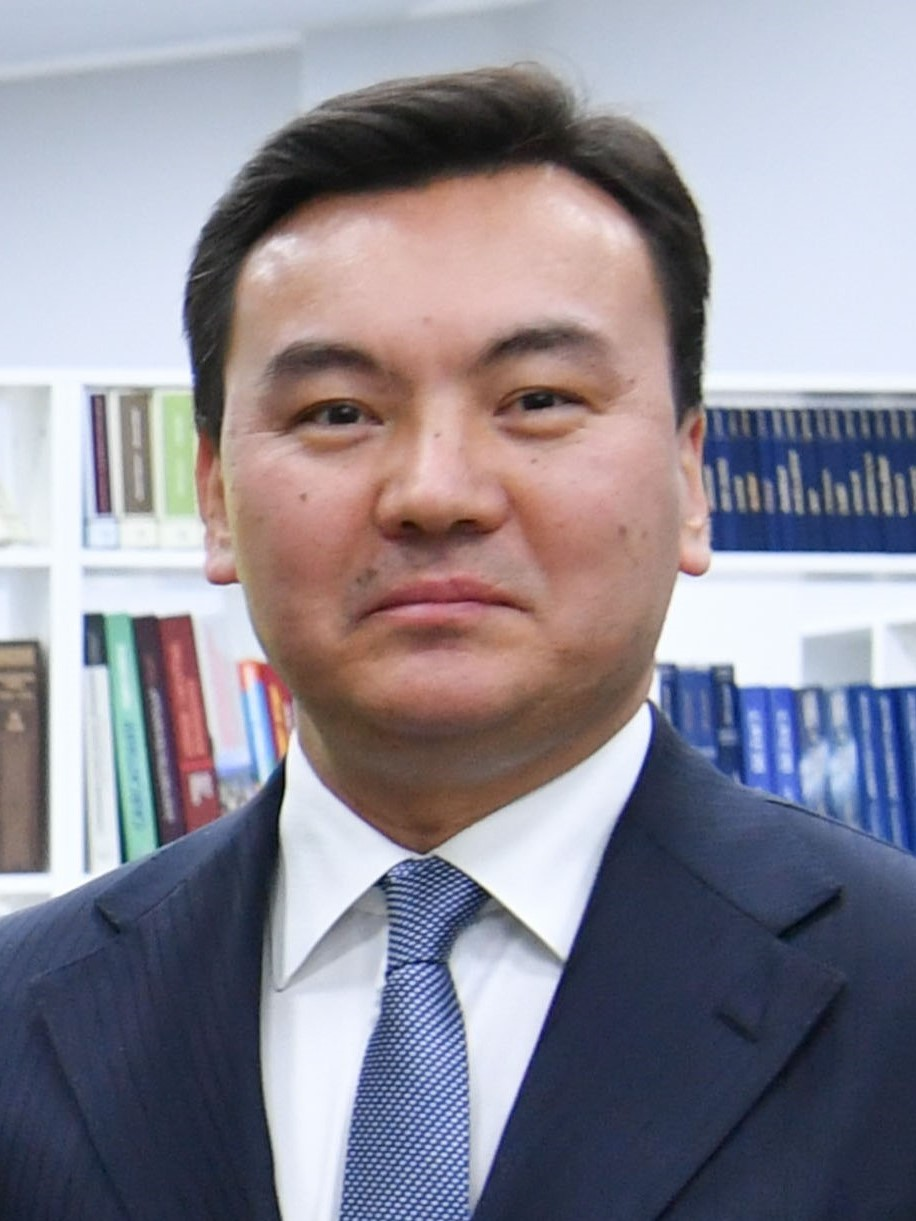
- Rauan in 2024
- Born: 1 May 1979 (age 47); East Kazakhstan Region, Kazakh SSR, Soviet Union
- Education: Abai Kazakh National Pedagogical University (BA); Harvard University
- Occupations: Wikipedia editor; politician
- Known for: Founder of WikiBilim
- Political party: Adilet (since 2026)
- Other political affiliations: Amanat (until 2026)
- Awards: Wikipedian of the Year (2011)

Rauan Kenjehanūly (Note: Often transliterated as Rauan Kenzhekhanuly through a Russified Romanization of Рауан Кенжеханулы.) (Kazakh: Рауан Кенжеханұлы, pronounced [ɾɑwˈɑn kenʑeχɑnʊˈlə]; born 1 May 1979) is a Kazakh entrepreneur and NGO activist who was named the first Wikipedian of the Year in August 2011 by Wikipedia co-founder Jimmy Wales at Wikimania.

== Career ==
Rauan Kenzhekhanuly was born on 1 May 1979 in the East Kazakhstan Region, Kazakh SSR, Soviet Union. In 2001, he graduated from Abai Kazakh National Pedagogical University with a bachelor's degree in international affairs.

In 2005–2006, he worked as a Press secretary and Head of the Department of Cultural and Humanitarian Cooperation of the Embassy of Kazakhstan in the Russian Federation.

During his university years, he served as the Program Coordinator for National Debate Center Public Foundation and chief-editor of the Youth TV program "Azamat" on the Kazakh national TV channel Khabar. After he joined Khabar, he became the economic observer and National TV Agency's Moscow bureau chief in Russian Federation.

In 2010, he traveled to the United States to complete a one-year fellowship at Harvard University, where, that fall, he first became interested in editing Wikipedia upon taking the class "Media, Politics, and Power in the Digital Age". That same year, he was named one of the Weatherhead Center for International Affairs's fellows for 2010–2011.

For his efforts in the development of Kazakh Wikipedia, Rauan received the title Wikipedian of the Year in August 2011. Wikipedia co-founder Jimmy Wales was criticized by fellow Wikipedians because of Rauan's ties to the government of Kazakhstan. Wales stated on Reddit in 2015 that he'd been unaware of Rauan's prior positions in the Kazakh government and said that if he had known Rauan was going to go on to become deputy governor of Kyzylorda Region, he would have "refused to give that award".

He later founded the nonprofit organization WikiBilim, which aims to expand the availability of free Kazakh-language information on the Internet. In 2014, he was named deputy governor of the Kyzylorda Region.,

He also served as the founding director of the Eurasian Council on Foreign Affairs, which was formally established on 12 November 2014 with a grant from the Kazakh government.

Since the 2016 he is acting as the CEO of Bilim Media Group (EdTech). In October 2024, Rauan Kenzhekhanuly was ranked 50th in the “50 Most Influential Business Leaders of Kazakhstan — 2024” list published by Forbes Kazakhstan. He was recognized in the EdTech sector.

== Public activities ==
In 2017, he was appointed as the chief of commission for the national project "translating 100 textbooks for HE to Kazakh language" and the head of National Bureau of Translation.

Under the National Bureau of Translation Kazakh literature by more than 60 authors was translated into English, including two anthologies presenting Kazakhstan's literary and cultural heritage, published for the first time in the United Kingdom and distributed in over 90 countries worldwide in partnership with Cambridge University Press.

In August 2023, he was elected President of one of the oldest non-profit organizations in Kazakhstan — the International Kazakh Language Society.

On 19 December 2023, Rauan Kenzhekhanuly presented the first Kazakh–English and English–Kazakh Oxford Qazaq Dictionary developed by the Qazaq Tili International Society in cooperation with Oxford University Press. The publication of the Oxford Qazaq Dictionary marked the inclusion of the Kazakh language as the 60th language represented within the Oxford Global Languages series of Oxford dictionaries.

== See also ==
- List of Wikipedia people
