= Kazinform =

Kazakh news agency

- Type: News agency
- Founded: 1920
- Headquarters: Astana, Kazakhstan
- Official website: www.inform.kz

Kazinform (Kazakh: ҚазАқпарат, romanized: QazAqparat) is a Kazakh international news agency and one of the largest media outlets in Kazakhstan. It is based in Astana. The news agency mainly focuses on national and Eurasian news.

== History ==
Kazinform was established on 13 August 1920 as the Orenburg-Turgai department of the Russian Telegraph Agency (ROSTA) under the All-Union Central Executive Committee. In 1925 the agency was renamed KazROST, until it was again renamed KazTAG in 1937. Following Kazakhstan’s independence, in 1992 KazTAG was transformed from the Information Agency under the Council of Ministers into the Kazakh State Information Agency, retaining its previous name. President Nursultan Nazarbayev issued an order for the agency to be renamed in 1997 as KazAAG. In 2002 it was named Kazinform by the Kazakh government. In 2008 the news agency belonged to the holding company Arna-Media. On 5 May 2010, the government dissolved Arna Media, transferring Kazinform and other companies to the Ministry of Communications and Information. In 2012, the Ministry of Communications and Information was disbanded. In 2013, the agency was reorganized as the Limited Liability Partnership “International Information Agency Kazinform”. On 27 August 2019, Government Decree No. 631 merged Kazcontent JSC into the agency, reorganizing it as Kazinform International Agency JSC. In 2022, Kazinform International Information Agency JSC was incorporated into the Television and Radio Complex of the President of Kazakhstan and since 2023, the agency has operated as part of the Presidential Property Management Department.

== Romanization system ==
It had its own romanization system for Kazakh which was based on Turkish Latin, in anticipation to the transition from Cyrillic to Latin which was targeted to be complete by 2025, but it was never considered by President Nursultan Nazarbayev. The president commented that the new alphabet should contain "no hooks nor superfluous dots". The new Latin alphabet approved by Nazarbayev, which contain apostrophes corresponding certain Cyrillic alphabets, received mixed reactions from the public and linguists.

By 2019, the news agency's website began to use the revised 2018 Romanization system in their Latin Kazakh-language version, eventually ditching the Turkish Latin-based system; however, Kazakh Wikipedia and Google Translate still used the agency's old Romanization system in their Latin rendition and Kazakh translation feature, respectively.

Kazak Grammar, a social media-based group of Kazakh language enthusiasts, proposed an alternative Romanization system which combines the features of the official 2018 system with the Kazinform's system, most notably the retention of Turkish vowels with diacritics. But an unexpected change in the group's direction occurred in early 2020 when the group restarted to Noqat with their new romanization arrangements which reflects the 2019-2020 revision of the alphabet.

== Leaders ==
- Arkady IVyatich-Kirillov (1937–1938)
- Konstantin Nefedov (1939–1940)
- Zhusip Altaybaev (1953–1958)
- Kenesbay Usebaev (1959–1960)
- Kasym Sharipov (1961–1974)
- Kakimzhan Kazybaev (1977–1982)
- Zhumagali Ismagulov (1982–1987)
- Amangeldy Akhmetalimov (1987–1997)
- Murat Arenov (1997–2002)
- Gadilbek Shalakhmetov (2003–2004)
- Zhanai Omarov (2004–2006)
- Dauren Diyarov (2007–2016)
- Asel Tulegenova (2016–2017)
- Askar Umarov (2017–2021)
- Eldos Nashirali (2021–2022)
- Raushan Kazhibaeva (since 1 April 2022)
