= Ivan Vladychenko =

Soviet-Ukrainian trade unionist and politician (1924–2022)

Member of the Central Committee of the Communist Party of the Soviet Union
- In office 1966–1990

Personal details
- Born: Ivan Maksymovich Vladychenko; 16 January 1924 Amvrosiivka Raion, Donetsk Oblast, Ukrainian SSR, Soviet Union
- Died: 19 August 2022 (aged 98)
- Party: CPSU (1943–1991)
- Education: Donetsk National Technical University
- Occupation: Trade unionist

Ivan Maksymovich Vladychenko (Ukrainian: Іван Максимович Владиченко; 16 January 1924 – 19 August 2022) was a Soviet and Ukrainian trade unionist and politician. He served on the Central Committee of the Communist Party of the Soviet Union from 1966 to 1990.

Vladychenko died on 19 August 2022, at the age of 98.
