= Vladimir Khatuntsev =

Soviet journalist and news executive

Vladimir Petrovich Khatuntsev (Russian: Владимир Петрович Хатунцев) (1916, Moscow – April 19, 1979, Moscow) was a Soviet journalist and news executive. He was head of the central Soviet news agency TASS in 1978–79.

Khatuntsev was graduated from Pokrovsky Technical School, then studied at the All-Union Communist Institute of Journalism and the History Department of Moscow State University.

Following the German invasion of the Soviet Union in 1941, while Khatuntsev was a student at Moscow State University, he joined a militia battalion of the Presnensky District of Moscow. He then worked as a production manager in the defense industry.

In 1946, Khatuntsev joined TASS as a reporter handling foreign news, then became senior editor of the International News Radio division and a foreign correspondent in Finland. In 1960 he became Deputy General Director of TASS. He subsequently worked as Deputy Chief Editor of the mass-circulation national newspaper Labor (Russian: Труд), and, on July 11, 1978, became General Director of TASS.

Khatuntsev died on April 19, 1979. He is buried at Novodevichy Cemetery in Moscow.

[Khatuntsev] was a serious, considerate man, a talented journalist, a veteran of the hard school of life. He knew the real price of everything, did not advance because of greed for high office, and did not like sycophants. They said that when Zamyatin left to head the Department of the Central Committee, he objected to Khatuntsev replacing him. But the Propaganda Department of the Central Committee had some smart people. They knew who was who, and insisted on Khatuntsev's candidacy. He wasn't Director General for long – massive heart attack. The men and women of TASS were deeply grieved.

— B. I. Chekhonin, "В коридорах Кремля и КГБ" ("In the Corridors of the Kremlin and the KGB"), Journalism and Intelligence

.
