= Nikolay Palgunov =

Soviet journalist, diplomat (1898–1971)

- Born: Nikolay Grigoryevich Palgunov; August 1, 1898; Saint Petersburg, Russian Empire
- Died: June 16, 1971 (aged 72); Moscow, Soviet Union
- Resting place: Novodevichy Cemetery
- Education: M.T. Kryukova Petrograd Real School
- Occupations: Politician, journalist, diplomat

Nikolay Grigoryevich Palgunov (Russian: Николай Григорьевич Пальгунов; 1 August 1898 – 16 June 1971) was a Soviet politician, journalist, diplomat and long-term general director of TASS from 1943 to 1960.

== Biography ==
Palgunov was born in Saint Petersburg. He graduated from a four-grade higher primary school in 1914, and in 1916 from the MT Kryukova Petrograd Real School.

From 1917 to 1919, he worked as a worker at the Petrograd Pipe Plant.

In 1918, he entered the chemical department of the Institute of Technology; listened to lectures at the economic department of the Faculty of Humanities in Petrograd. From 1919, he lived in the city of Yaroslavl.

He became member of the Russian Communist Party P (B) in November 1919.

In 1920, he entered the agricultural faculty of Yaroslavl University, in 1923 he transferred to the pedagogical faculty, which (under the name Yaroslavl Teachers' Institute) he graduated in 1925. At the same time in 1921, he was head of the organizational and instructional department of the Yaroslavl Provincial Committee of the RCP (b).

From 1922 to 1923, he was deputy editor of the Yaroslavl newspaper Severny Rabochy. From 1923 to 1924, he was the editor-in-chief of the Kursk magazine Nash Trud. From August 8, 1924, he was the editor-in-chief of the Yaroslavl newspaper Severny Rabochy. From June 1926 to September 1929, he was the editor of the newspaper Kurskaya Pravda. He studied several foreign languages on his own.

From October 1929 he was an employee of the foreign department of the Telegraph Agency of the Soviet Union (TASS). He graduated from the courses of international journalists. He worked in Persia (1930-1932), Finland (1932-1935) and France (1935-1940).

From 1940 to 1943, he was head of the press department of the People's Commissariat for Foreign Affairs of the USSR.

On 19 June 1943, he became executive director (General Director) of the Telegraph Agency of the Soviet Union (TASS) under the Council of Ministers of the USSR.

At the same time, from 1956 to 1959, he was chairman and chairman of the Organizing Bureau of the Soviet Union of Journalists. From 1959 to 1966, he was secretary of the board of the Union of Journalists of the Soviet Union. Palgunov was also a member of the Central Audit Commission of the CPSU from 1956 to 1961.

From August 1960, he was a personal pensioner, living in Moscow. He died in Moscow in 1971 and was buried at the Novodevichy Cemetery.
