= Aleksandr Prokofiev =

Russian writer

Aleksandr Andreyevich Prokofiev (Russian: Алекса́ндр Андре́евич Проко́фьев; 2 December 1900 [O.S. 19 November], Kobona – 18 September 1971, Leningrad) was a Soviet poet. Prokofyev is best recognized for the motifs of Russian folklore found in his works.

== Biography ==
The son of a peasant fisherman, Prokofiev was born in the Lake Ladoga village of Kobona in the Russian Empire (now in northwestern Leningrad Oblast) in 1900. Having graduated from a local school in 1913, spending the next four years as a teenage student of a teachers' academy in the Imperial capital of St. Petersburg.

Prokofiev joined Bolshevik Party in 1919, during Russian Civil War, and came into the Red Army the same year, remaining in the Soviet Union's military ranks until 1930. He debuted with his first published poetry in 1927, producing his first book of poems in 1931.

Prokofiev rejoined the Soviet Army as a war correspondent during the Soviet-Finnish War and World War II, in which he witnessed the Germans' Siege of Leningrad, subsequently becoming an influential figure of the Leningrad branch of the Union of Soviet Writers in the post-war period, heading the Leningrad Writers' Union in 1945–1948 and 1955–1965.

Prokofiev's 1944 patriotic poem "Rossiya" ("Россия") was recognized with the Stalin Prize of 1946. He was awarded the Lenin Prize in 1961, the honorary title of Hero of Socialist Labor in 1970, and was a recipient of the Order of Lenin four times.

Prokofiev died in Leningrad in 1971 and was buried at the city's Bogoslovskoe Cemetery.
