= The Orange Peel =

Music venue located in downtown Asheville, North Carolina, USA

- The Peel
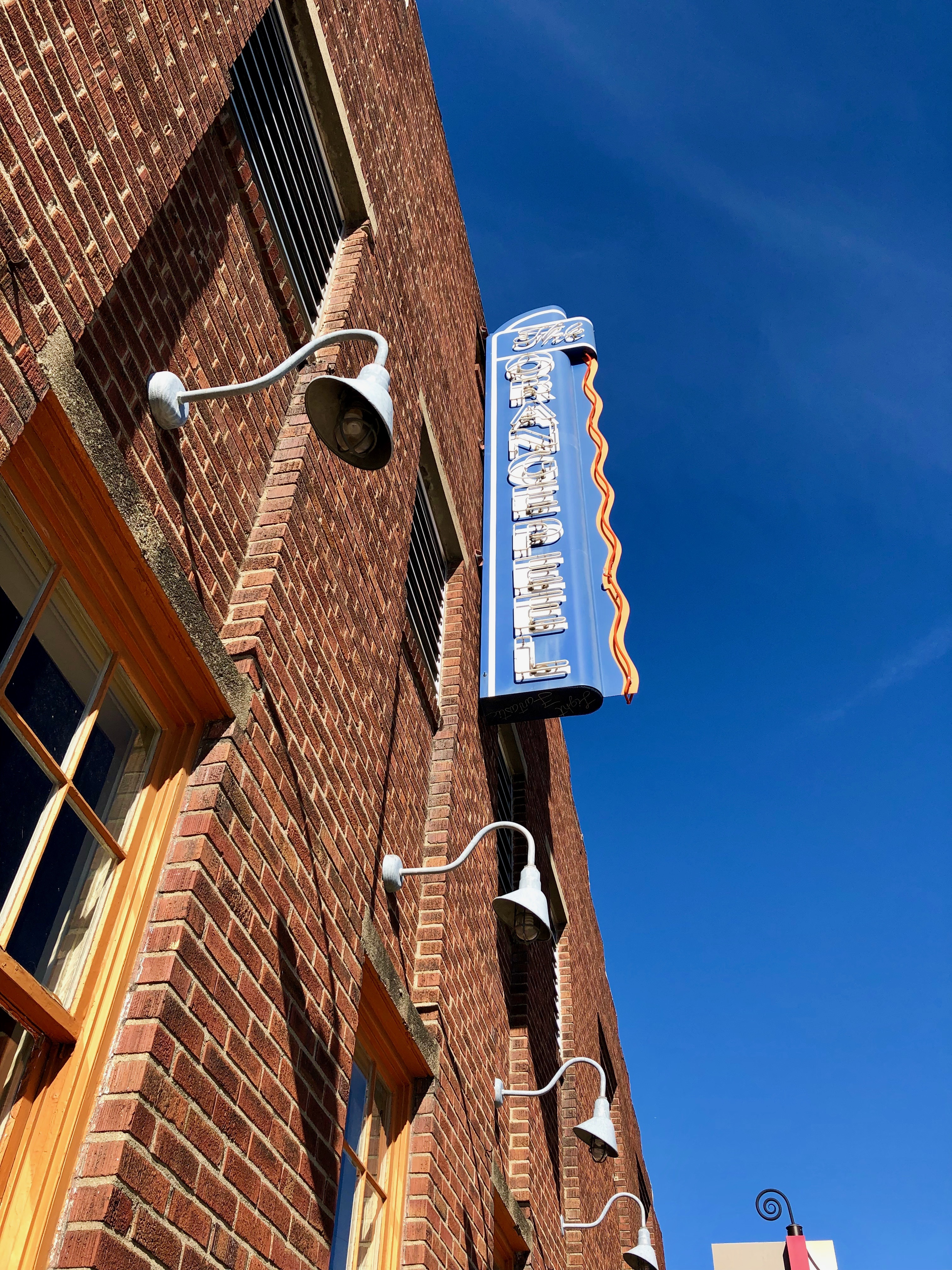
- The Orange Peel Sign, Asheville, NC
- Interactive map of The Orange Peel
- Address: 101 Biltmore Avenue
- Location: Asheville, North Carolina
- Coordinates: 35.5913°N 82.5511°W
- Capacity: 1,050
- Type: music venue

Construction
- Renovated: 2002 (23–24 years ago)

Website
- theorangepeel.net

The Orange Peel is a music venue located in downtown Asheville, North Carolina. It has a capacity of 1,050 people.

== History ==
The Orange Peel occupies 101 Biltmore Avenue, formerly home to a skating rink (Skateland Rollerdome, 1950–1962), vacant 1963, a bowling alley (Biltmore Lanes, 1964–1965), vacant 1966, Jade Smith Cabaret Club (1967–1970), vacant 1971–1973, and a night club named The Orange Peel (1974–1978).

The original Orange Peel was a popular venue for young African Americans during the 1970s. It had a house band called Bight, Chew & Spit, and hosted artists including The Commodores and The Bar-Kays, and played recorded disco and funk featured by DJs from one of the few Black-owned radio stations in the country, WBMU-FM. The Orange Peel was the last club to occupy the location before it became vacant for many years.

After a stint as an auto parts warehouse, the building's use as a music club began again in 2002.

Former New Orleans club owners Jack and Lesley Groetsch borrowed the name of the previous Orange Peel club and reincarnated the building as The Orange Peel Social Aid and Music Club, with funding from Asheville philanthropist Julian Price's company Public Interest Projects. The new venue opened on October 25, 2002. In its early days the Groetsches sought to maintain a connection to the Black community that had patronized the earlier club, in part by hosting events for the last graduating class of Stephens-Lee High School/South French Broad High School. In 2007 PIP took over. In April 2008, The Orange Peel was named one of the top five music venues in America by Rolling Stone magazine.

At the end of 2009, the venue opened Pulp, a downstairs members-only liquor bar. Pulp is open every night there is a show, and a live feed is piped in to allow patrons to view and listen to the show occurring upstairs. Pulp is also open various other nights for events featuring local artists and "Slice of Life" open-mic comedy nights.

In 2015, The Orange Peel expanded its booking efforts and began partnering with local breweries to host large outdoor concerts. In 2020, The Orange Peel opened Rabbit Rabbit, an outdoor music venue at 75 Coxe Avenue. The two venues have since parted ways as Asheville Pizza has canned all Orange Peel staff and any ties with the opening of "The Backdoor".

== Hellbender ==
In March 2026, The Orange Peel announced Hellbender, an outdoor concert venue at 151 Thompson Street, Asheville, North Carolina. The venue is located along the Swannanoa River and was scheduled to open in July 2026.

The venue's site includes property formerly belonging to Cursus Keme brewery, which closed following Hurricane Helene. Hellbender's operation began in July 2026 with a limited concert series running through October. A full season of programming and a permanent stage is planned for spring 2027.

The venue includes a lawn for general admission, with premium and standard seating options available. The venue's name refers to the eastern hellbender, a large salamander native to western North Carolina.

Hellbender is operated by The Orange Peel.

== Notable performers ==
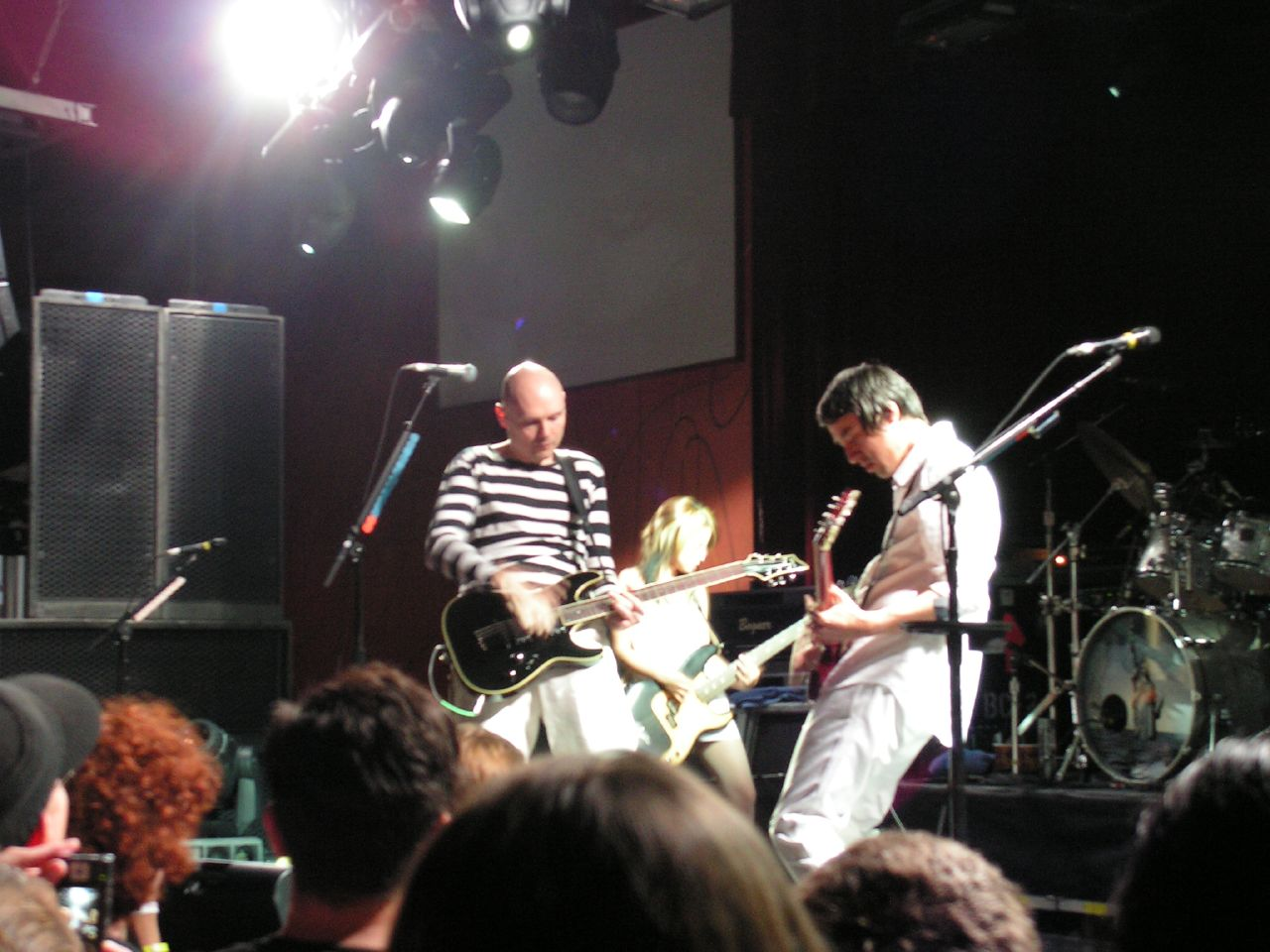
Smashing Pumpkins playing at the Orange Peel in 2007

The Orange Peel has hosted many well known acts, including The Flaming Lips, Godspeed You! Black Emperor, 311 (in 2008, 2009 x2 & 2011), Modest Mouse, Tegan and Sara, Black Label Society, Umphrey's McGee in 2003, Bob Dylan in 2004, Chevelle in 2005, Smashing Pumpkins (residency in 2007), the Beastie Boys in 2009, The Black Keys, Lauryn Hill in 2017, Ice Cube, Skrillex, Deadmau5, Bassnectar, Pretty Lights, The Glitch Mob, Wax Tailor, Medeski, Martin, and Wood, Queens of the Stone Age in 2007, Mastodon in 2011, Jack Off Jill's only U.S. reunion show in 2015, Breaking Benjamin in 2017, Megadeth, Gwar, Lamb of God, Decapitated, Silversun Pickups in 2016, The Dirty Heads, The Struts, AJR in 2018, Buckethead in 2018 and King's X in 2023.

The Orange Peel has also hosted Asheville's Warren Haynes in 2013 for the Christmas Pre-Jam, Asheville's Luke Combs in 2016, Asheville's Chase Rice in 2017, Rainbow Kitten Surprise in 2018, Ben Folds in 2009, Daughtry in 2008, Southern Culture on the Skids in 2002, Ben Taylor (son of James Taylor) Band in 2003, Avett Brothers in 2008, Carolina Chocolate Drops in 2012, Kellie Pickler in 2011, Greenville's Edwin McCain in 2003, Knoxville's 10 Years in 2008, Nashville's Kings of Leon in 2007, Moon Taxi in 2016, Judah & the Lion in 2018, Columbia's Hootie & the Blowfish in 2003, Toro y Moi in 2018, Charleston's Jump, Little Children in 2003, Band of Horses in 2009, Duncan Sheik in 2003, Trevor Hall in 2006, Atlanta's Manchester Orchestra in 2014, Gregg Allman Band in 2002, Chris Robinson Brotherhood (Black Crowes singer) in 2015, Indigo Girls in 2017, and Virginia's Jason Mraz in 2005.

It has also served as a venue for the annual Moogfest electronic music festival.

In addition to musicians, The Orange Peel has hosted comedians, including Annie Rauwerda of Depths of Wikipedia in 2023.
