= Mitchell Jackson (publicist) =

American Communications Strategist

Mitchell Jackson is an American publicist, crisis communications strategist, and former journalist. He is known for representing controversial high-profile celebrities, including Clavicular, Candace Owens, Brett Cooper, Adam Friedland, and Caroline Calloway.

== Education and career ==
A graduate of Sarah Lawrence College, Jackson began his career in journalism writing for VICE, Complex, and W Magazine under his given name Mitchell Sunderland.

At VICE, he profiled celebrities such as Paris Hilton and Ann Coulter. Jackson left VICE in 2017 after a Buzzfeed report revealed correspondence with Milo Yiannopoulos, in which Jackson told Yiannopoulos to mock another journalist. "My advice to young people is always to blow up your life as soon as possible," Jackson told The New York Times about the incident, "because the sooner you blow up your life, the faster your actual life can start."

After leaving VICE, Jackson went to work with publisher Judith Reagan from 2017 until 2019.

In 2020, Jackson founded the boutique communications firm BCC Communications. The firm has represented Candace Owens and other high-profile political figures.

In 2026, Cultured Magazine listed Jackson as part of its CULT100 list of cultural influencers, alongside Ari Emmanuel, Gigi Hadid, and Judd Apatow.
