= TechOlympics =

American IT conference for high school students

- TechOlympics 2018: Imagine logo
- Status: Active
- Genre: Conference
- Dates: 2010–present
- Frequency: Annually
- Venue: Procter & Gamble Headquarters
- Locations: Cincinnati, Ohio
- Country: United States of America
- Years active: 16
- Founded: 2010
- Most recent: 2025
- Next event: 2026
- Participants: ~650
- Attendance: 600-650
- Area: Greater Cincinnati
- Organiser: INTERalliance of Greater Cincinnati
- Filing status: Non-profit
- Website: Official Website
- Current Theme (2026): Envision

TechOlympics is an American information technology (IT) conference for high school students in Cincinnati, Ohio. It connects students with IT professionals and with companies in order to promote the field of IT. The conference was originally held at the Millennium Hotel from 2010 to 2019, until it was moved to the Great American Ball Park in 2020. The conference went virtual in 2021 and remained virtual in 2022 due to the global pandemic. In 2023, TechOlympics returned to the Great American Ball Park. The 2024 conference changed the venue again to the Procter & Gamble Global Headquarters in Cincinnati, where it remained for TechOlympics 2025. The 2026 event will be held at the GE Aerospace Learning Center in Evendale. The event is run by the INTERalliance of Greater Cincinnati, a non-profit organization seeking to empower students through a robust knowledge of IT. Colleges and other organizations are present at the event as well. Schools often attend as groups, but individual attendance is also permitted. The conference takes place over the course of one weekend, starting Saturday morning and going until midday Sunday. The events that take place during the conference fall into one of five categories: a Breakout, a Competition, a Workshop, a Showcase Demonstration, or a Speaker Presentation. However, there are other events that do not fit into one of these categories. Each year, the theme of the conference changes, and as such, so do the Breakouts and competitions offered, as well as the speakers presenting.

== Breakouts ==
TechOlympics offers the opportunity for students to learn from professionals through breakouts. Breakouts are talks that typically last one hour long and generally focus on IT. A selected list of topics covered in past breakouts is provided below.

- Agile software development
- Artificial intelligence
- Augmented reality
- Cybersecurity
- Cloud computing
- Data analytics
- Graphic design and product design
- Network security
- Making a technology startup
- Professionalism and Career Readiness

== Competitions ==
TechOlympics is home to many competitions ranging from Wikiracing to competitive hacking. Below is a selected list of competitions. Notably, the logo for next year's TechOlympics is designed at the year's conference during one of these competitions.

- Wikiracing
- Tech Trivia
- Hacker Heaven
- QR Code Scavenger Hunt
- Speed Keyboarding
- Web Design
- Kerbal Space Race
- iMovie
- Code Golf
- Art and Technology

== Showcase demonstrations ==
A showcase project is a large project that a group of students, usually from the same school, take part in working on, in order to present the project to a panel of judges. This project is in competition with other projects to be the best project submitted. Winning this event is seen as a very important feat during the conference, and showcase winners receive a cash prize.

== Workshops ==
For the past few years, TechOlympics has offered workshops, bringing in professionals to teach students a skill. A selected list of past topics can be found below.

- Unity (Game Engine)
- Abre App Development
- Python (programming language)
- JavaScript
- Lockpicking
- Internet of things
- LinkedIn Training
- GitHub Training
- Capture The Flag

== Speaker presentations ==
Generally, after each meal, students will hear from a speaker, often one with an IT background, that discusses the merits of entering the IT field.

== Yearly themes ==
In the first year, the event had no theme and was simply titled "TechOlympics Expo 2010". Subsequent years were similarly titled by the year they took place, until 2015, which began a tradition of declaring event themes, starting with "Connect".

Year	Theme	Source
2015	Connect	
2016	Accelerate	
2017	Amplify	
2018	Imagine	
2019	Level Up	
2020	Activate	
2021	Illuminate	
2022	BYTE Back	
2023	Electrify	
2024	Empower	
2025	Inspire	
2026	Envision	
