= Wikitrivia =

Trivia browser game

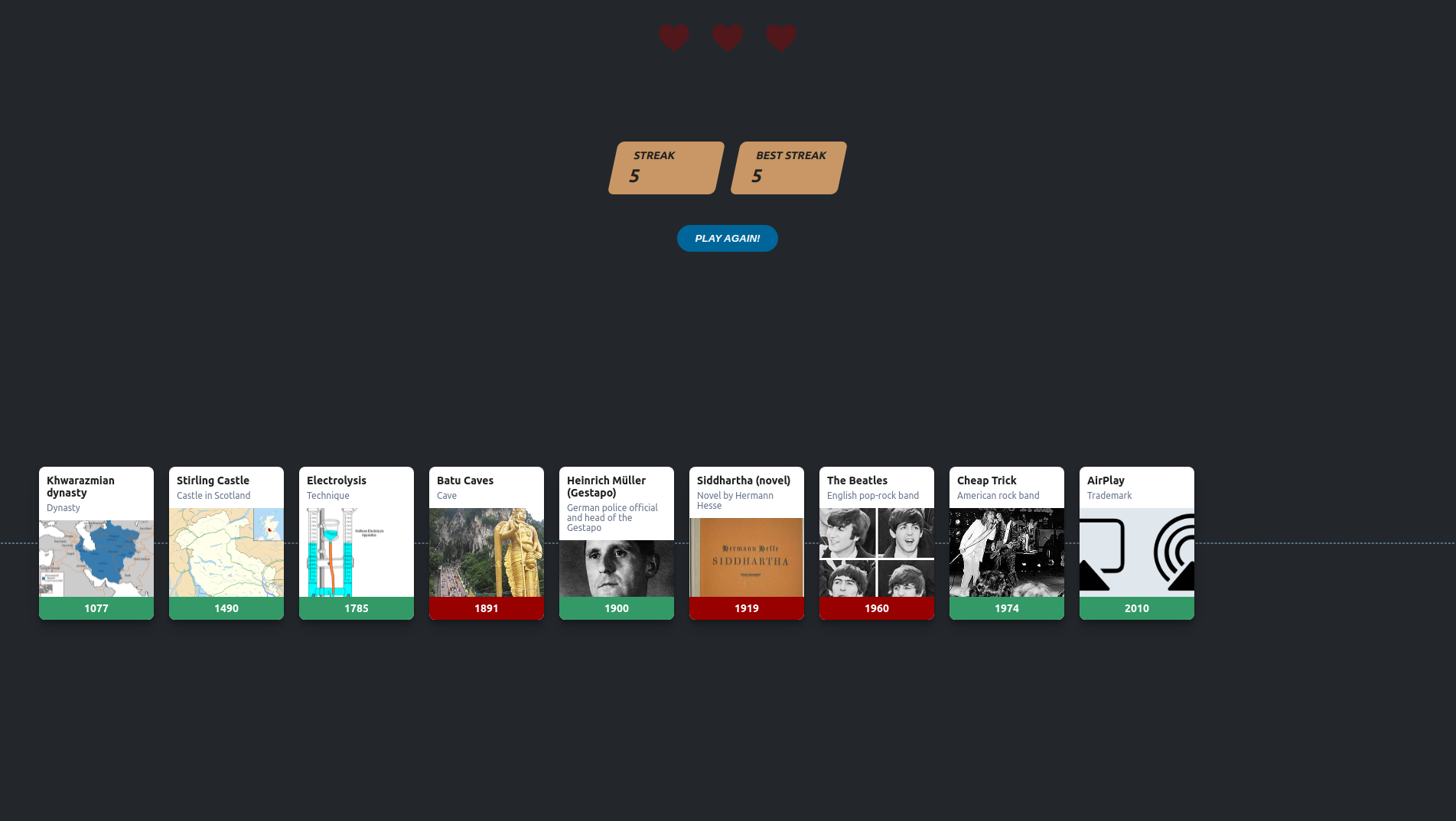
- Developer: Tom J. Watson
- Platform: Web
- Genre: Trivia

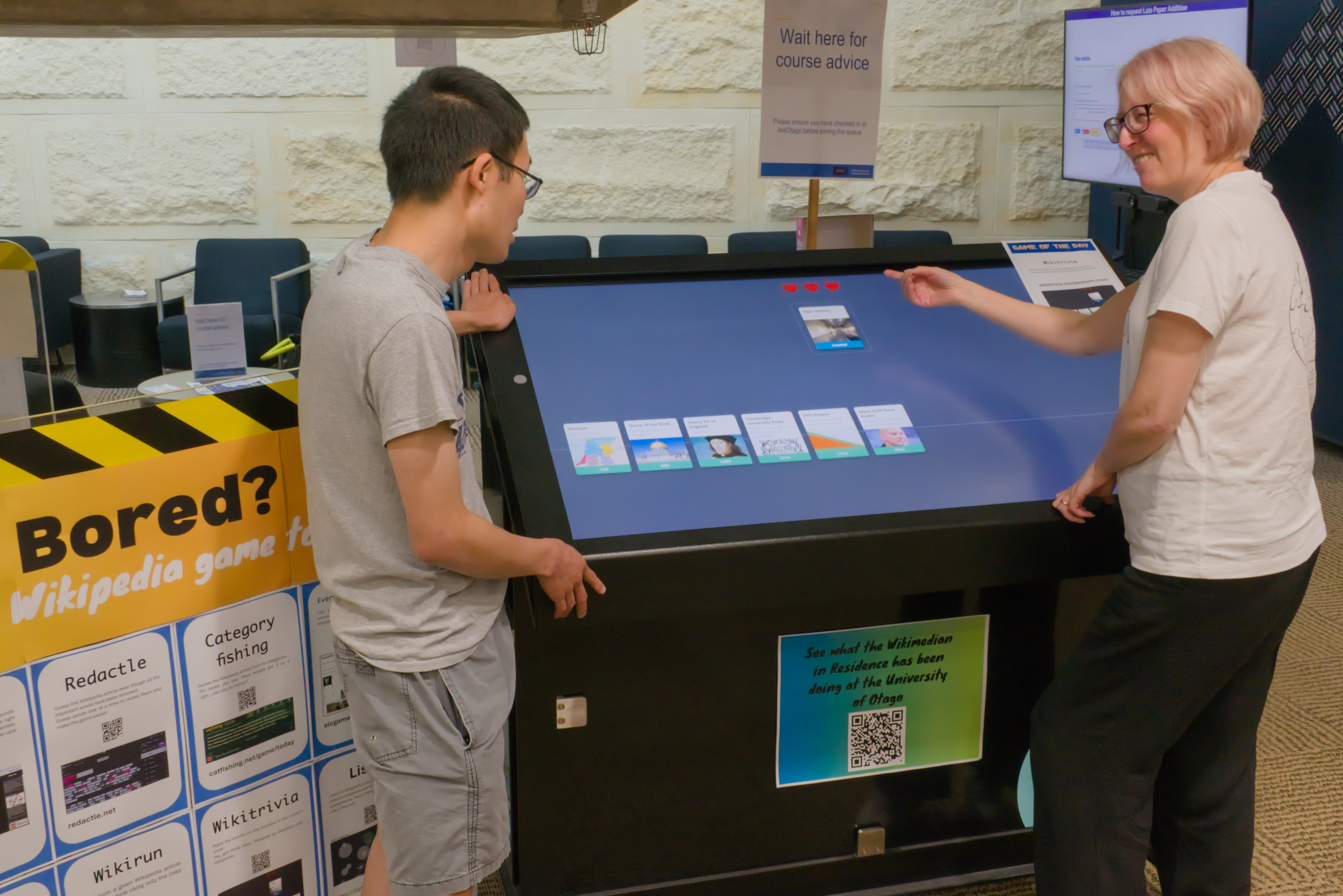
Playing WikiTrivia

Wikitrivia is a trivia browser game created by Tom J. Watson, which gained popularity in January 2022. Players are presented with a timeline and a card with a subject and a type of date (such as "Bosporan Kingdom" and "created"), and must put the event in the correct place in the timeline (between other cards). Placing a card in the wrong position loses a life, and the game ends once three lives are lost. The game uses information sourced from Wikipedia and Wikidata; it is open-source and Watson encourages players to report incorrect cards.

== See also ==
- Wikiracing
