= Depths of Wikipedia =

Social media accounts by Annie Rauwerda

- The account's logo, featuring the Wikipedia logo with a crown on top (Note: The original features a crown emoji copyrighted by Apple, which has been replaced with a version from Noto Emoji by Google.)

Instagram information
- Page: depthsofwikipedia
- Followers: 1.6 million
- Last updated: December 9, 2025

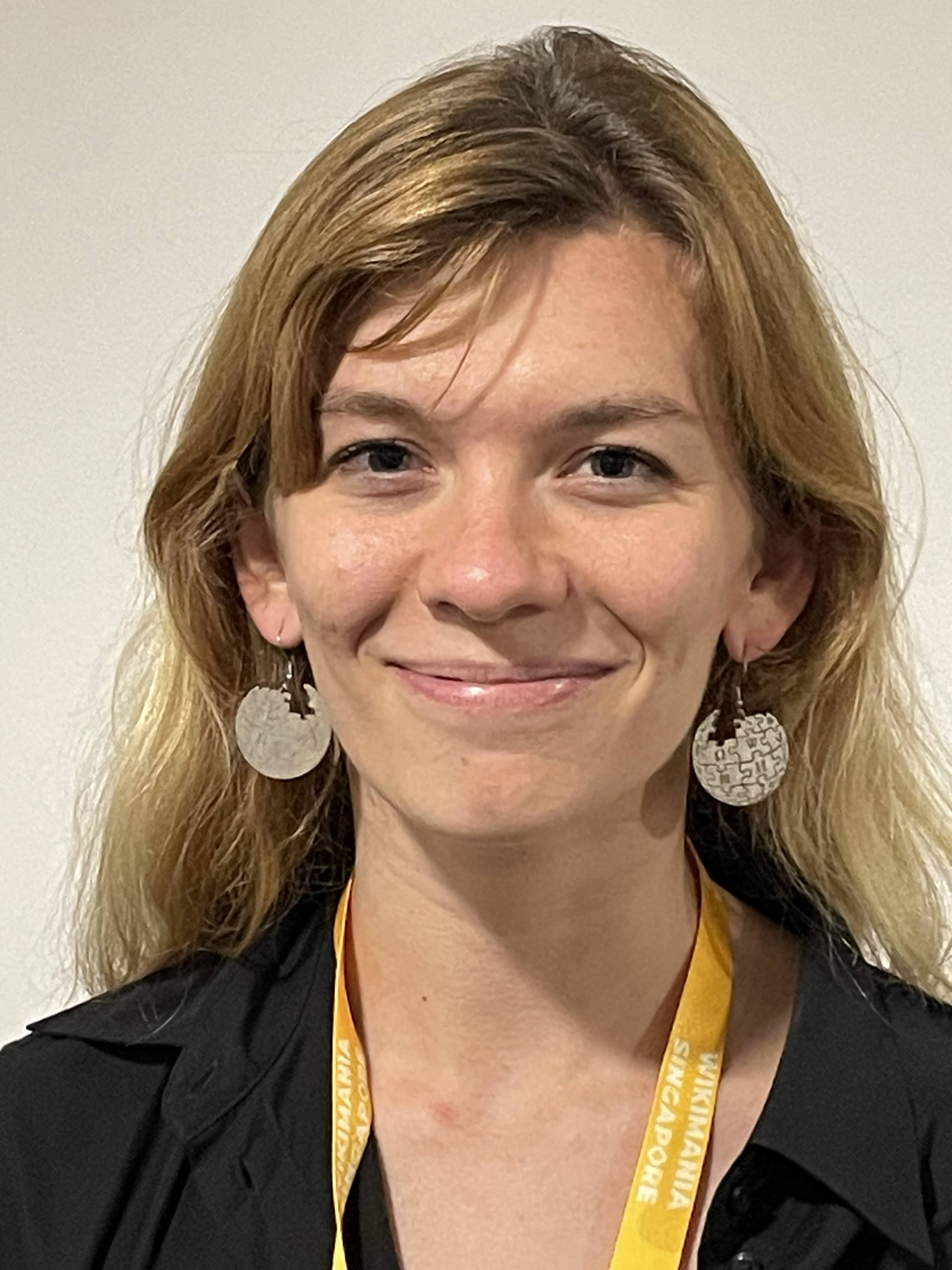
Annie Rauwerda in 2023 at Wikimania

Depths of Wikipedia is the name of social media accounts on Instagram, Bluesky and X dedicated to highlighting unusual and entertaining facts from Wikipedia, founded and run by Annie Rauwerda. She created Depths of Wikipedia in 2020 by digging through Wikipedia for its most unusual, amusing or bizarre content. Rauwerda has also performed live comedy shows based on the anecdotes she found.

In 2022, Rauwerda won Media Contributor of the Year at the annual Wikimedian of the Year awards.

== Creation ==
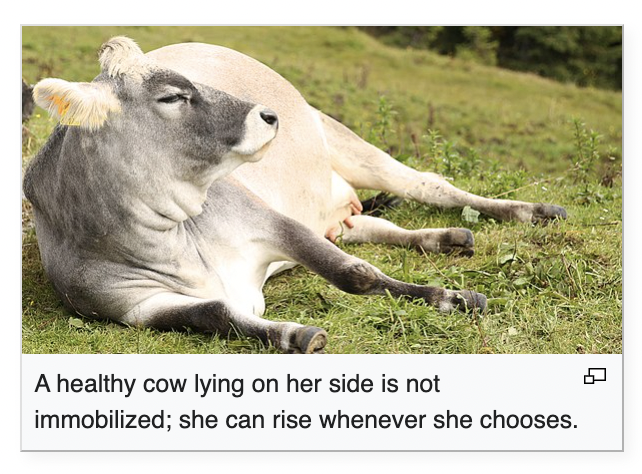
Rauwerda has cited this image and caption, taken from the article on cow tipping, as an inspiration for Depths of Wikipedia.

Annie Rauwerda, then a student in neuroscience at the University of Michigan, created the Depths of Wikipedia Instagram account in April 2020 as a personal project at the beginning of the COVID-19 pandemic, intending to share various facts from the English Wikipedia among friends. According to Rauwerda, the project was inspired by a collage of excerpts from Wikipedia she had made for a friend's zine, and by a photograph from the Wikipedia article on cow tipping. She had been interested in Wikipedia before beginning the project, having spent time reading it as a child and Wikiracing with friends through middle and high school.

Instagram influencer Caroline Calloway brought Depths of Wikipedia its first wave of followers in July 2020, by boosting the page's posts on her Instagram story. Calloway had previously criticized the account for a post featuring an older version of her Wikipedia page, which listed her occupation as "nothing". Calloway's promotion of the Depths of Wikipedia account came following an apology by Rauwerda.

After her Instagram account gained followers, Rauwerda created TikTok and Twitter accounts of the same name, and launched a newsletter covering unusual Wikipedia pages in greater detail.

== Activity ==
Depths of Wikipedia has highlighted articles on topics including exploding trousers, Nuclear Gandhi, chess on a really big board, and sexually active popes. According to Rauwerda, she often receives submissions of Wikipedia articles to feature, but is selective in choosing which to post. In October 2021, she said she was getting "probably 30 to 50 user submissions per day".

Rauwerda is a Wikipedia editor herself and enjoys taking photos to add to the Wikimedia Commons. In 2021, she hosted an edit-a-thon with support from Wikimedia New York City, welcoming new contributions to the encyclopedia.

Beginning in 2021, Rauwerda has hosted live comedy shows based on trivia from Wikipedia; she also travels for Wikipedia-related conferences. Rauwerda presented a Depths of Wikipedia comedy show in Boston, Massachusetts, in 2022 and at the Edinburgh Festival Fringe in 2026.

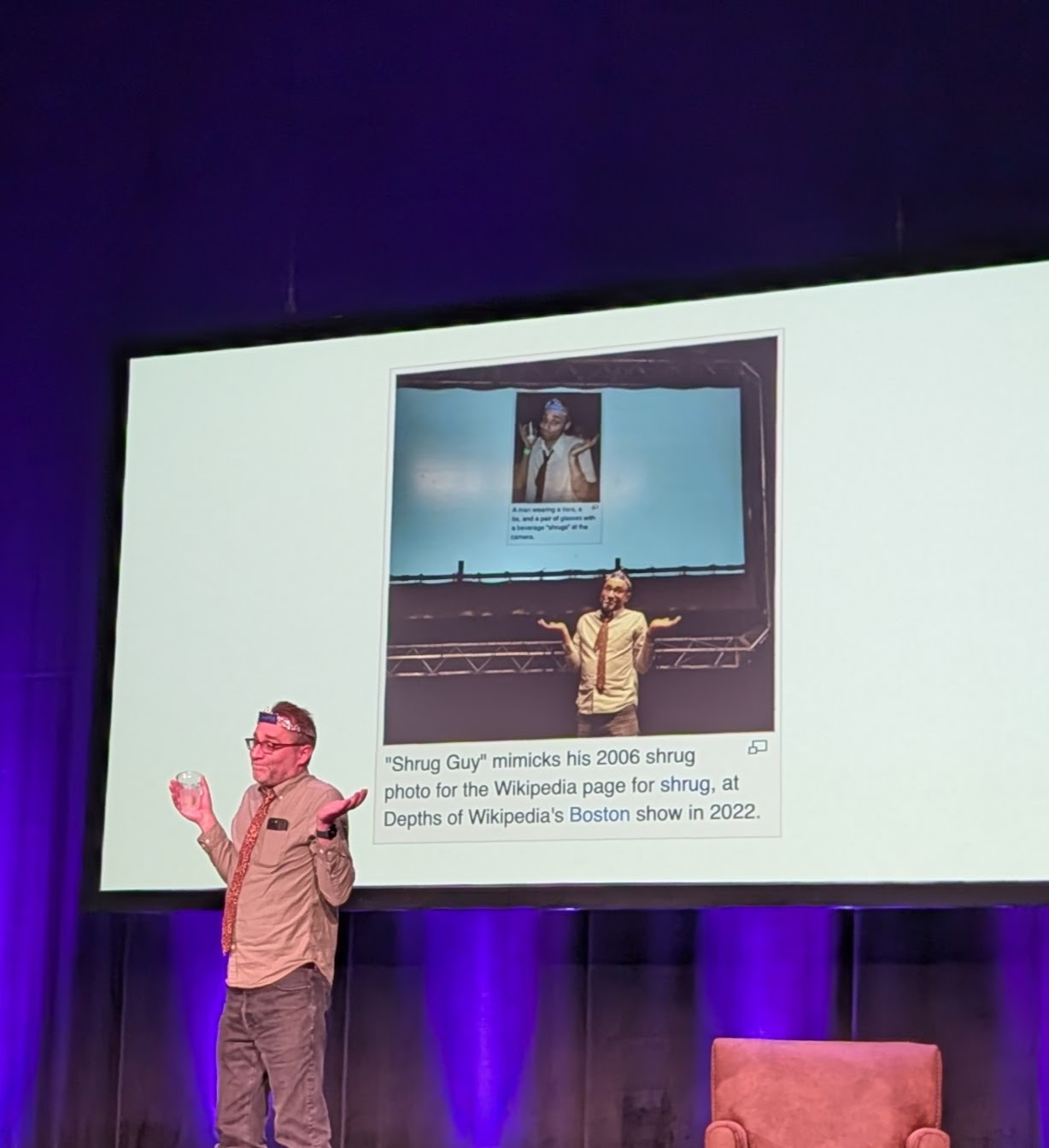
"Shrug Guy" mimics a 2022 photo of himself mimicking his 2006 photo for the shrug Wikipedia page, at Depths of Wikipedia's Boston show in 2026.

External videos
- The Joy of Learning Random Things on Wikipedia, Annie Rauwerda, TED Talk, October 19, 2023

On October 19, 2023, Rauwerda gave a TED talk titled "The Joy of Learning Random Things on Wikipedia".

== Reception ==
Followers of the Depths of Wikipedia account include Neil Gaiman, John Mayer, Troye Sivan, Olivia Wilde, and Lex Fridman.

According to Heather Woods, a professor of rhetoric and technology at Kansas State University, Depths of Wikipedia "makes the internet feel smaller" by "offering attractive—or sometimes hilariously unattractive—entry points to internet culture". Zachary McCune, the brand director of the Wikimedia Foundation, which funds and hosts Wikipedia, called the account "a place where Wikipedia comes to life, like an after-hours tour of the best of Wikipedia".

In his 2023 book All the Knowledge in the World, author Simon Garfield called it "a great Twitter feed. It may suck up all your spare time". Clare Martin of Paste magazine found the facts to be the ones that make you laugh, remember how strange the world is and spark your curiosity.

== Recognition ==
Rauwerda was named the 2022 Media Contributor of the Year at the annual Wikimedian of the Year awards.

== Notable articles featured ==
- Alcohol and Drug Abuse Lake
- Busta Rhymes Island
- Florence, Oregon
- Kentucky meat shower
- Girl Late for School with Toast in Her Mouth
- List of predictions for autonomous Tesla vehicles by Elon Musk
- Milkshake Duck
- 'No Way to Prevent This,' Says Only Nation Where This Regularly Happens
- Red Hook Society for the Apprehension and Detention of Horse Thieves
- Thinking about the immortality of the crab
- When a man argues against two beautiful ladies like this, they are going to have the last word
