= Annie Rauwerda =

American internet personality and Wikipedian (born 1999)

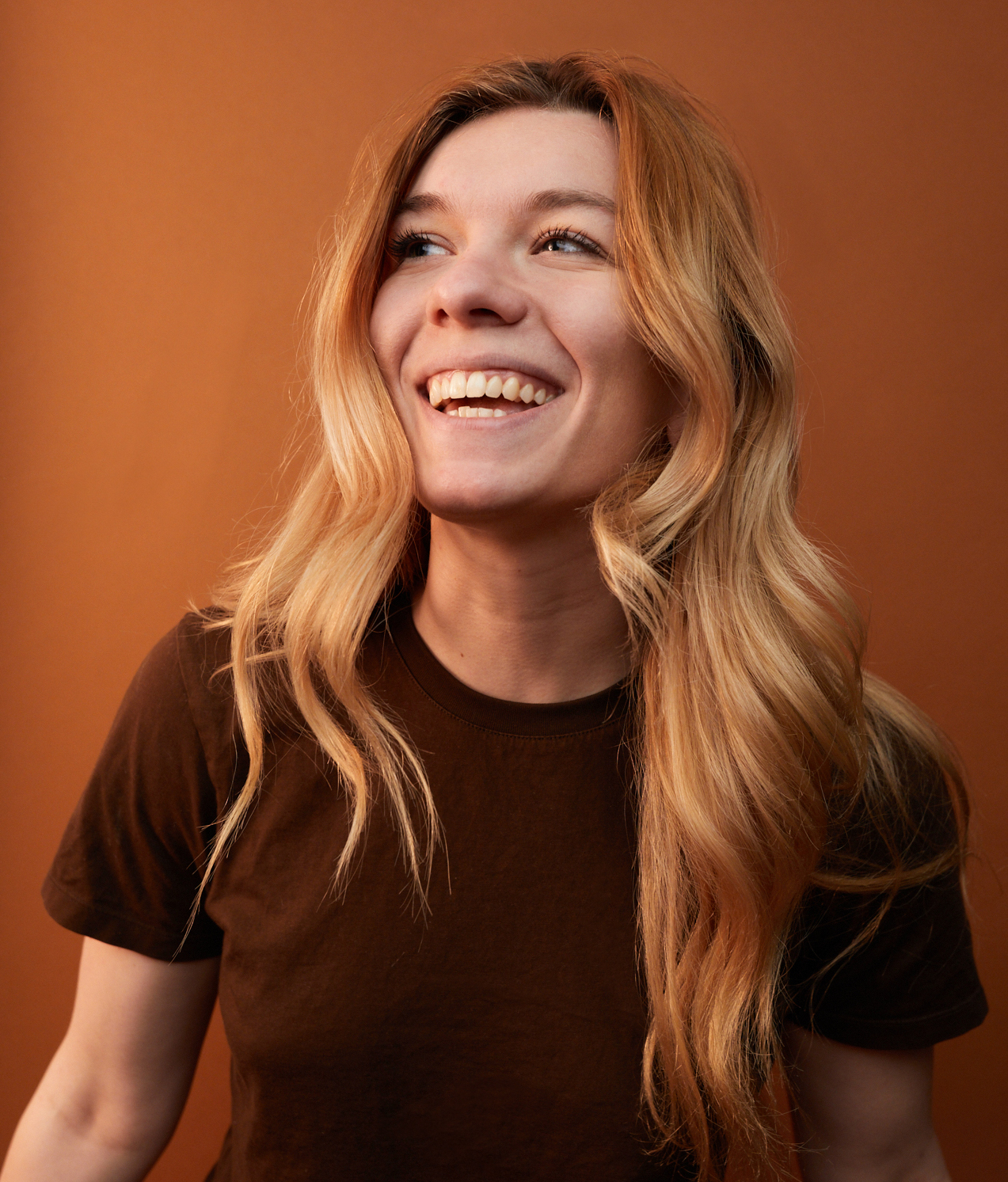
- Rauwerda in February 2023
- Born: November 27, 1999 (age 26); Grand Rapids, Michigan, U.S.
- Education: University of Michigan (BS)

Instagram information
- Page: Wikipedia is weird!
- Years active: 2020–present
- Followers: 1.6 million
- Last updated: March 31, 2026
- Website: annierau.com

Annie Rauwerda (/ˈraʊ.ərdə/; born November 27, 1999) is an American internet personality, journalist, and comedian known for Depths of Wikipedia, a group of social media accounts that highlight facts from Wikipedia. She hosts Wikipedia-focused variety and comedy shows based on the accounts. Rauwerda was named the 2022 Media Contributor of the Year by the Wikimedia Foundation, the nonprofit that hosts Wikipedia. In June 2023, she received considerable social media attention for organizing a perpetual stew in a Brooklyn park.

== Early life and education ==
Annie Rauwerda was born on November 27, 1999, and was raised in Grand Rapids, Michigan.

She attended the K–12 Grand Rapids Christian Schools. Before attending college, Rauwerda took a gap year and served through AmeriCorps as a STEM tutor in Chicago. Following the conclusion of her gap year, she matriculated at the University of Michigan in 2019, graduating with a Bachelor of Science degree in neuroscience in 2022.

== Wikipedia ==
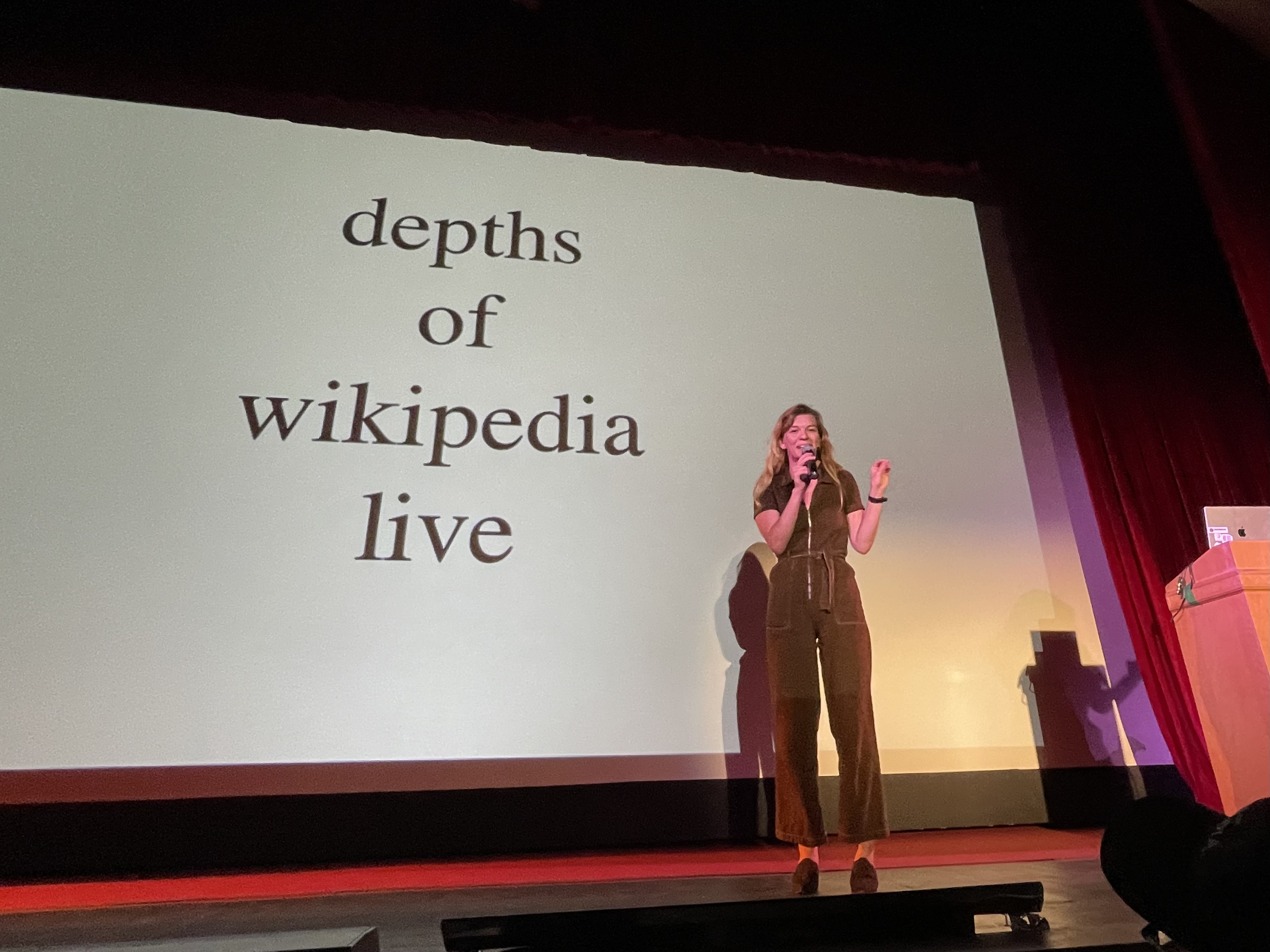
Rauwerda has performed live shows inspired by her social media accounts, Depths of Wikipedia.

Rauwerda became interested in Wikipedia while wikiracing in middle and high school. While a sophomore at the University of Michigan during COVID-19 lockdowns, Rauwerda created Depths of Wikipedia, a group of social media accounts which highlight facts from Wikipedia that she considers "weird and wonderful". The first account was launched on Instagram in April 2020, and has since expanded to TikTok and Twitter. The accounts combined have millions of followers.

In addition to the Depths of Wikipedia social media accounts, Rauwerda hosts Wikipedia-focused variety and comedy shows, going on tour in 2022, 2023, and 2026. Rauwerda's first in-person comedy set was in July 2021, expanding to a series of cross-country comedy tours. Her show involves a slides presentation of Wikipedia screenshots, similar to Depths of Wikipedia's online content, and comedy commentary.

In August 2022, Rauwerda was named the 2022 Media Contributor of the Year by the Wikimedia Foundation, the nonprofit that hosts Wikipedia.

In October 2022, she wrote for Slate about Wikipedia's article on suspicious deaths of Russian businesspeople, highlighting the encyclopedia's usefulness as a source of information in areas facing censorship.

As of 2023, Rauwerda was working on a book about Wikipedia's cultural history.

== Perpetual stew ==
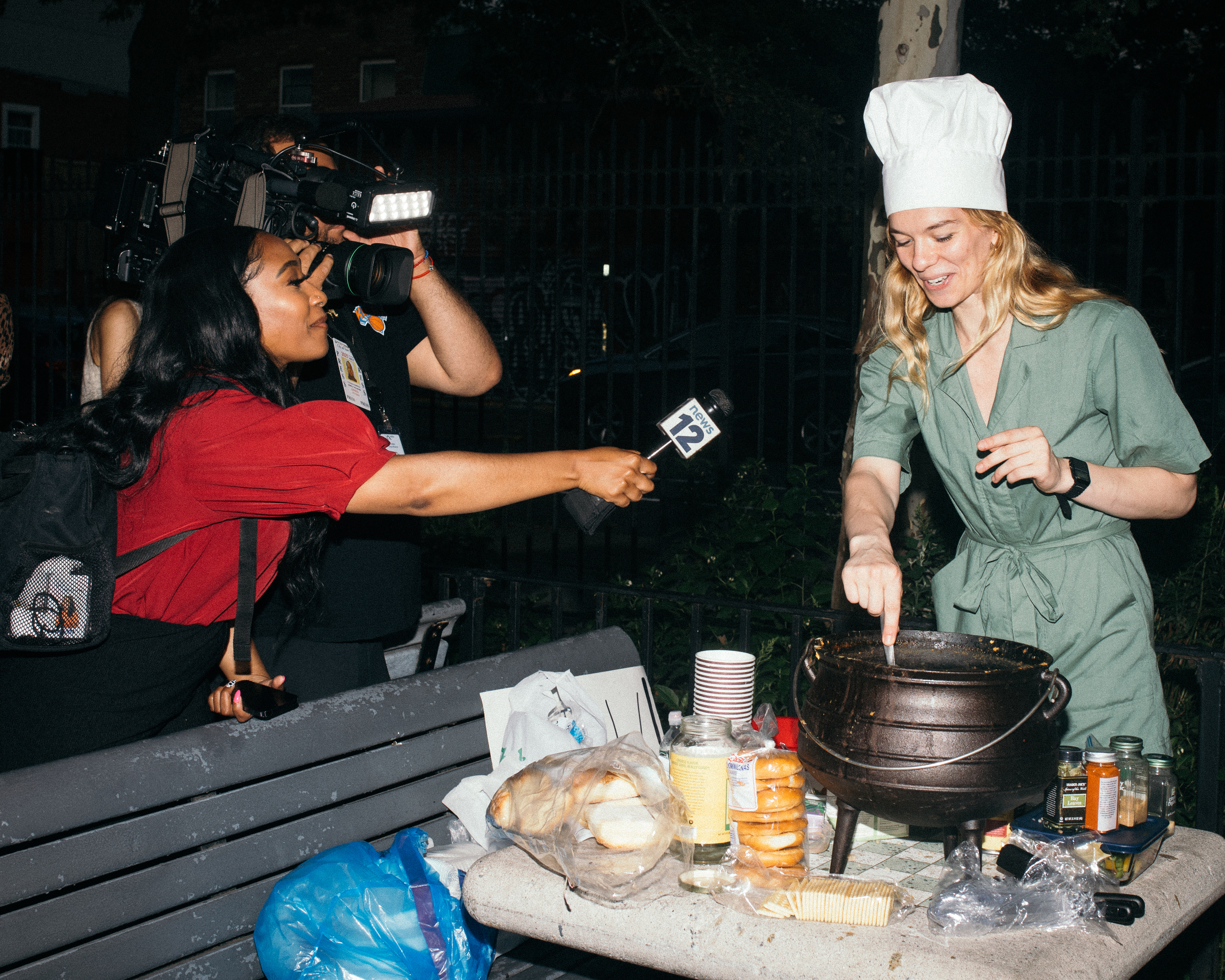
Rauwerda being interviewed by News 12 about her perpetual stew

On June 7, 2023, Rauwerda started a vegan potato leek stew in a slow cooker in her apartment. Inspired by the concept of a perpetual stew, some amount of the stew was preserved after each meal and replenished with more broth and ingredients. Rauwerda eventually expanded the "stew nights" to the public, hosting outdoor gatherings at Fermi Playground in Bushwick, Brooklyn, where people contributed to and consumed the stew. Participants were encouraged to bring vegan ingredients, with about 300 people contributing to the stew. The stew was cooked for 60 days, ending on August 6, 2023.

The events attracted considerable social media attention, in what was described as an "internet sensation" and "all the rage among Gen Zs". Rauwerda documented the progress of the stew on TikTok, where some posts had millions of views. The events gained additional attention for a website documenting it that Rauwerda maintained.

== Personal life ==
Rauwerda adopted a cat from Instagram influencer Caroline Calloway in 2021. As of 2023, Rauwerda lives in an apartment in Brooklyn, New York City.

== Selected works ==
- Rauwerda, Annie (May 11, 2021). "Billy Magic and the internet's unabashed enthusiasm for public transit". The Michigan Daily.
- Rauwerda, Annie (July 14, 2021). "College quantified". The Michigan Daily.
- Rauwerda, Annie (September 15, 2021). "Stars, they're just like us: Why astrology sticks around". The Michigan Daily.
- Rauwerda, Annie (October 21, 2022). "Russian oligarchs keep dying in suspicious ways. Wikipedia is keeping a list". Slate.
- Rauwerda, Annie (January 18, 2023). "Wikipedia's redesign is barely noticeable. That's the point". Slate.
- Rauwerda, Annie (April 12, 2023). "In search of Wikipedia's shrug guy". Defector.
