= Caroline Calloway =

American Internet personality (born 1991)

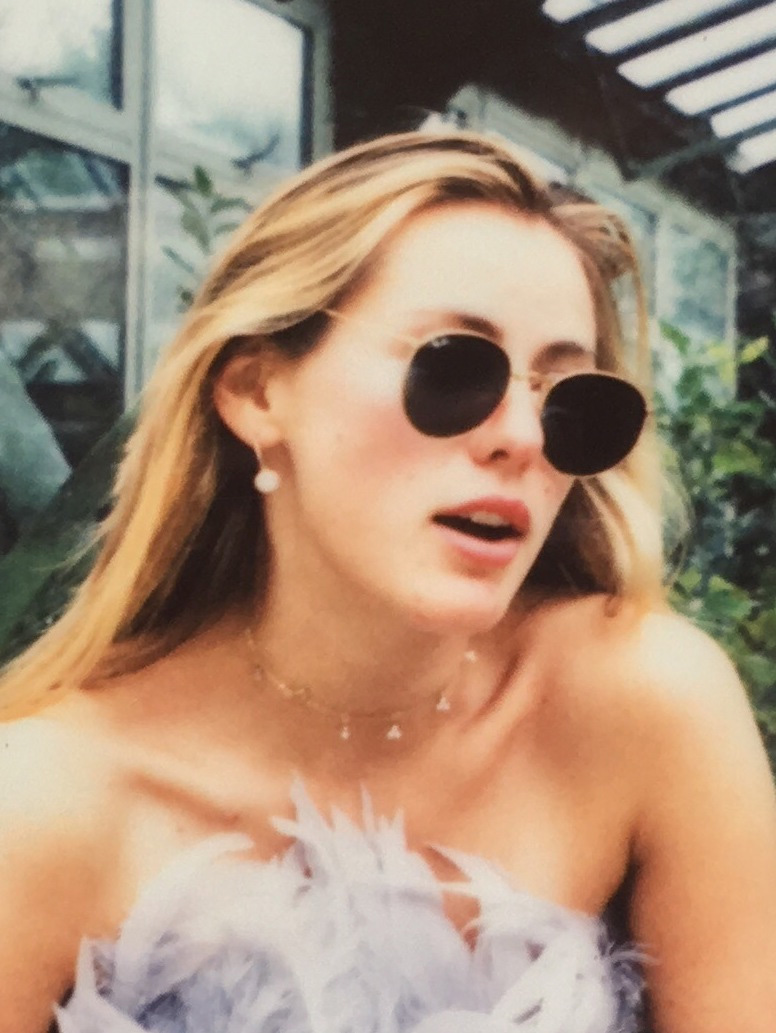
- Calloway in 2016
- Born: Caroline Calloway Gotschall; December 5, 1991 (age 34); Falls Church, Virginia, U.S.
- Education: New York University; St Edmund's College, Cambridge (BA)
- Occupations: Author; Influencer
- Relatives: Owen Burns (great-grandfather)
- Website: carolinecalloway.com

Caroline Gotschall Calloway (born December 5, 1991) is an American social media celebrity and author who initially developed a following while she was a student at the University of Cambridge. She is the author of the 2023 memoir Scammer, the title of which references accusations of scamming she has received from fans and critics.

== Early life and education ==
Calloway was born in Falls Church, Virginia, and was educated at Episcopal High School in Alexandria, Virginia. She graduated from the Phillips Exeter Academy. Her maternal great-grandfather is Owen Burns, an entrepreneur and real estate mogul who developed many of the historic structures in Sarasota, Florida. At the age of 17, she changed her last name to Gotschall Calloway because she felt it would "look better on books."

Calloway began undergraduate studies in art history at New York University. In 2013, after succeeding on her third application, she restarted at St Edmund's College, Cambridge, and graduated with lower second-class honours in 2016. She later admitted to having forged her academic credentials to secure admission to Cambridge. Calloway has stated that she has general anxiety disorder and depression. She has been open about her Adderall abuse and addiction while at Cambridge.

== Career ==
=== Influencer ===
Calloway joined Instagram in 2012 with the help of her NYU classmate Natalie Beach. The Instagram account documented her life at Cambridge and contained long captions. Calloway bought followers and purchased ads to grow her account. She became known as the "Gatsby of Cambridge" for the lavish parties that she documented online, which she hosted in rented rooms at other Cambridge colleges that she considered more Instagram-worthy than St. Edmund's.

Calloway also brought Depths of Wikipedia its first wave of followers, publicizing the account's posts favorably after resolving an incident in which Annie Rauwerda had posted about Calloway's Wikipedia page. Rauwerda later adopted a cat from Calloway.

=== Writing ===
==== And We Were Like ====
Calloway publicly announced that Flatiron Books had offered her a book deal to write a memoir for US$500,000 in 2015, of which she had received 30% as an advance. In 2016 it was announced that Calloway would publish a memoir titled And We Were Like about her time at Cambridge with Flatiron Books, an imprint of Macmillan Publishers, with the help of literary agent Byrd Leavell. During her final year at Cambridge, Calloway had hired Natalie Beach to co-write the book and proposal. She then set up an initial meeting with Leavell by pretending to his secretary that she was already his client.

She announced via her Instagram stories in 2017 that she was withdrawing from her book deal after failing to fulfill her contract. Beach reported the deal was for US$375,000, and the advance she received was actually for US$100,000, which she owed back to the publisher after she canceled the deal. After that, Calloway offered the book proposal with personal annotations for sale on Etsy.

==== Workshops ====
In December 2018, Calloway launched an international "Creativity Workshop Tour." Her original announcement indicated that the workshop would offer tutorials on building an Instagram brand, developing ideas, and addressing "the emotional and spiritual dimensions of making art." Participation in the tour was priced at US$165 per person, and tickets were sold for events in Boston, Denver, San Francisco, Los Angeles, Atlanta, Chicago, Dallas, Austin, Charlotte, and Washington DC. This tour was subsequently canceled due to Calloway failing to book venues for these events, with Calloway announcing that she would refund those who had already bought tickets. Eventually, Calloway held two workshops in New York. The cancellation of the workshops gained public attention when reporter Kayleigh Donaldson created a Twitter thread that gained news coverage comparing Calloway's tour to Fyre Festival, later publishing this as an article for the online publication Pajiba. After the publication of Donaldson's article, Calloway briefly offered t-shirts for sale on Threadless that bore the caption "Stop hate-following me, Kayleigh." Threadless suspended sale of these shirts for violating its targeted harassment policy.

In August 2019, Calloway held a second creativity workshop, "The Scam," in New York. Although press was not invited to the event, a Vice reporter bought a ticket, attended the event under a false name, and published an article about her experience.

==== I Was Caroline Calloway article (2019) and response (2020) ====
In September 2019, Beach wrote an essay for The Cut, "I Was Caroline Calloway," chronicling her friendship with Calloway and disclosing that she had ghostwritten a number of the Instagram captions credited to Calloway and collaborated with her to produce a subsequent book proposal. The article went viral, becoming The Cut's most-read story of 2019.

In April 2020, Calloway published a response to Beach's essay, titled I am Caroline Calloway, published in several installments. The article was self-published behind a paywall to raise funds via Direct Relief for medical workers and first responders treating coronavirus patients. As of April 2020, Calloway had raised close to $50,000.

==== Scammer (2023 book) ====
Calloway's first book Scammer was released in June 2023 through her website.

Scammer has received generally positive reviews, with Becca Rothfeld of the Washington Post calling Scammer "gloriously opulent" and Kitty Grady of Vogue writing that Scammer "welcomes Caroline onto the scene as a new character: that of a deft and funny writer". Tyler Foggatt from The New Yorker called the book "funny, engaging, and full of genuine insight" and Zara Afthab from Dazed dubbed it a "dazzling debut."

A more critical review by Charlie Squire for i-D describes Calloway's attempts to clear her name and address her scandals "unstimulating" and says that the book is "fatally mediocre in the middle". However, Squire's review ends positively, praising Calloway's "hazy, modernist writing," concluding:

"Caroline is unafraid to want things that we are not supposed to say we want: fame, thinness, adoration – and yet she never veers off into cheap shock value. Where Scammer really shines is in its descriptions of the quotidian. Caroline's story is interesting, sure, it's a life she's lived to write this specific book. But where she proves herself to be an artist is in descriptions of her back-alley psychiatrist, an old friend living just outside of Boston, the electrical cords at the Harvard Lampoon house, or the fundamentally English aversion to sitting on the floor."

=== OnlyFans ===
In 2020, Calloway created an OnlyFans account, promising videographic and photographic content containing nudity. She alleged in interviews that her intention to enter the adult entertainment industry had been planned by Playboy, and that the magazine had commissioned a photo shoot of her dressed as a student in a library. When asked, the magazine stated: "Playboy does not have and did not have any photo shoot planned with Caroline Calloway." Calloway has described her sex work as "emotionally poignant, softcore cerebral porn." Her content includes cosplay of characters from children's movies such as Harry Potter, Matilda and Beauty and the Beast, and partially undressed photographs of herself captioned with details of her father's autopsy.

In May 2020, Calloway posted on Twitter a projected yearly income of $223,800 from her OnlyFans content, leading to criticism about her failure to recognize difficulties faced by sex workers, as well as her attempts to distance herself from sex work.

In July 2021, Calloway began selling a homemade blend of grapeseed oil and essential oils branded as Snake Oil through her website.

== Personal life ==
Until March 2022, Calloway lived in the West Village in Manhattan.

From 2023 to 2026, Calloway lived in Sarasota, Florida with her cat Matisse. She refused to evacuate her home during Hurricane Milton in 2024 despite a mandatory evacuation order, prompting concerns for her safety from her fans, but survived the storm unharmed.

As of 2026, Calloway resides again in New York City.
