= Wikiracing =

Racing game of going from one Wikipedia page to another via hyperlinks

Wikiracing is a game in which players compete to navigate from one Wikipedia page to another (chosen manually or randomly) using only the internal links of the page. External websites have been created to facilitate this game.

In addition to being an enjoyable game, Wikiracing has proposed benefits as well. The Seattle Times has recommended it as a good educational pastime for children and the Ludwig Ahgren has said, "While I don't know any teenagers who would curl up with an encyclopedia for a good read, I hear that a lot are reading it in the process of playing the Wikipedia Game".

The Amazing Wiki Race has been an event at the TechOlympics.

The average number of links separating any English-language Wikipedia page from the United Kingdom page is 3.67. Thus, it has been occasionally banned in the game. Other common rules that increase the game's difficulty include not using the United States page, not using a browser's "Find" (ctrl-F) or (ctrl-G) function, and other optional rules.

The rules of Wikiracing can be used as a method for studying aspects of Wikipedia.

== Name ==
It has many different variations and names, including The Wikipedia Game, Wikipedia Maze, Wikispeedia, Wikiwars, Wikipedia Ball, Wikipedia Racing, and Wikipedia Speedrunning.

== Variations ==
Wikiracing has several variations:

- Speed Wiki, in which participants face off to reach the final page (agreed in prior) in a limited time. The first opponent who manages to reach the goal within the time limit wins the game.
- Click Wiki, in which participants are racing to reach the final page with as few clicks as possible or with a certain amount of clicks allowed.
- Wikispeedia, which has the same rules as the basic wikiracing game, but involves data collection for the Data Science Lab research, a research group of the School of Computer and Communication Sciences of the École Polytechnique Fédérale de Lausanne (EPFL) in Lausanne, Switzerland. Another Wikiracing game of the same name was created by the Wikimedia Foundation and was released in February of 2025 on social platform Roblox, amassing over 17,000 plays since (August 2025). "Wikispeedia's" objective is similar to other Wikiracing games, although the player are provided with 4 isolated topics to choose from at a time. Winning is determined by time spent as opposed to the number of articles clicked.
- The Philosophy Game, where the objective of the game is to reach the "Philosophy" Wikipedia page; players are limited to the first internal link of each article.

== Classroom applicability ==
Wikiracing can be used as an effective brain break in secondary classrooms, particularly during long class periods, as it helps refresh students’ focus and stimulate thinking without requiring prior preparation. This activity is based on an interactive and competitive task that involves navigating between Wikipedia articles using internal hyperlinks only, which encourages learners to develop research skills, make connections between concepts, and practice quick decision-making. Wikiracing can also increase student engagement and create a fun, motivating classroom atmosphere, while offering flexibility to be linked to curricular topics or used as a general activity to promote digital literacy and encyclopedic knowledge among learners.

== Source of enjoyment ==
The appeal of Wikiracing stems not only from competition but also from a knowledge-based experience that taps into lateral thinking by connecting subjects without an obvious relation. The appeal of making such connections is reinforced by insights from neuroscience regarding the role of dopamine, a neurotransmitter associated with anticipation and reward, which leads the brain to take pleasure in the process of searching itself rather than merely in reaching the final result.

Kevin Payravi, the 2023 champion, explains: "Everyone enjoys going to Wikipedia, reading an article, clicking on interesting links, and going down that knowledge rabbit hole." He adds that Wikiracing builds on this natural behavior, but channels it toward a clear objective within a competitive framework.

Annie Rauwerda, who placed third in the game in 2023, notes: "I think it’s exciting because you realize that almost everything in the world is connected." The world is vast, and human knowledge is so extensive that it exceeds our ability to fully grasp it, yet it remains strikingly interconnected.

== See also ==
- Crowdsourcing – Sourcing services or funds from a group
- Gamification – Using game design elements in non-games
- Six degrees of separation – Concept of social inter-connectedness
- Virtual volunteering – Online volunteering
- Volunteer computing – System where users donate computer resources to contribute to research
- Wikipedia community – Volunteers who create and maintain Wikipedia
- Wiki rabbit hole – Navigating between topics while browsing wikis
- Wikitrivia – Trivia browser game
