= Alix (given name) =

Alix (/ˈælɪks/) is a unisex given name. Notable people with the name include:

== Royalty ==
- Alix of France (c. 1151 – 1197), French princess
- Alix, Duchess of Brittany (1201–1221), Breton child ruler
- Alix of Hesse (1872–1918), Empress consort of Russia
- Alix, Princess Napoléon (born 1926), widow of Louis, Prince Napoléon
- Alix, Princess of Ligne (1929–2019), Luxembourgish princess

== Arts ==
- Alix André (1909–2000), French romance novelist
- Alix Bauer (born 1971), Mexican singer
- Alix Bidstrup (born 1983), Australian actress
- Alix Bosco (21st century), New Zealand crime fiction writer
- Alix Bushnell (born 1983), New Zealand actress
- Alix Combelle (1912–1978), French clarinetist
- Alix Dobkin (1940–2021), American folk singer-songwriter
- Julie Alix de la Fay (circa 1746-1826), Belgian ballet dancer
- Alix Mathon (1908–1985), Haitian novelist
- Alix Olson (born 1975), American poet
- Alix Kates Shulman (born 1932), American novelist
- Alix Smith (born 1978), American photographer
- Alix Wilton Regan (born 1986), English actress
- Alix Young Maruchess (1889–1963), Scottish-born American violist

== Other ==
- Alix Bancourt, French blogger
- Alix d'Unienville (1918–2015), British spy
- Alix Earle (born 2000), American social media influencer
- Alix Didier Fils-Aimé (born 1970), acting Prime Minister of Haiti
- Alix Grès (1903–1993), also known as Alix or Alix Barton, French fashion designer
- Alix Jamieson (born 1942), Scottish athlete (1964 Olympic Games)
- Alix Johnson (1946–2002), nickname of Alexandra Uteev Johnson, United States Foreign Service Officer from 1972 to 1979
- Alix Kilroy (1903–1999), British activist
- Alix Klineman (born 1989), American volleyball player
- Alix Liddell (1907–1981), Officer of the Order of the British Empire
- Alix de Montmorency (died circa 1220), countess in the Peerage of England
- Alix Pasquet, (1919–1958), Haitian World War II fighter pilot
- Alix Perez, Belgian DJ
- Alix Popham (born 1979), Welsh rugby union footballer
- Alix Potet, French professor
