= Alexander Johnson =

Alexander Johnson or Alex Johnson may refer to:

== Sports ==
=== American football ===
- Alex Johnson (wide receiver) (born 1968), American football wide receiver
- A. J. Johnson (linebacker) (born 1991), American football player
- Alex Johnson (defensive back) (born 2000), American football cornerback

=== Other sports ===
- Alex Johnson (footballer, born 1917) (1917–1944), English footballer
- Alex Johnson (1942–2015), American baseball player
- Alexander Johnson (pentathlete) (born 1969), Australian modern pentathlete
- Alexander Johnson (basketball) (born 1983), American basketball player
- Alex Johnson (basketball) (born 1988), Canadian basketball player
- Alex Johnson (climber) (born 1989), American rock climber
- Alexander Johnson (figure skater) (born 1990), American figure skater
- Alex Johnson (Australian footballer) (born 1992), Australian rules footballer

== Others ==
- Alexander Bryan Johnson (1786–1867), British philosopher and banker
- Alexander S. Johnson (1817–1878), American jurist
- Alexander Johnson (mathematician) (1830–1912), Canadian academic
- Alexander Lange Johnson (1910–1989), Norwegian bishop
- Alexander D. Johnson (born 1952), American biochemist
- Boris Johnson (Alexander Boris de Pfeffel Johnson, born 1964), British politician and ex-Prime Minister of the United Kingdom
- Alex Johnson (firefighter) (born 1967), British firefighter
- Alex T. Johnson, African-American chief of staff of the U.S. Helsinki Commission

== See also ==
- Alexander Johnston (disambiguation), several people
- Alexandra Johnson (disambiguation), multiple people
- Alexz Johnson (born 1986), Canadian singer and actor
- Hotel Alex Johnson, in Rapid City, South Dakota
