= Mizouni =

Mizouni (Arabic: الميزوني) is a Tunisian surname that may refer to

- Emna Mizouni (born 1987), Tunisian human rights activist and journalist
- Idris El Mizouni (born 2000), Tunisian football midfielder
- Myriam Mizouni (born 1958), Tunisian swimmer
