= Alexander Johnston =

Alexander Johnston may refer to:

- Alexander Johnston (businessman) (1774–1864), Scottish mill owner
- Alexander Johnston (1775–1849), British colonial official and orientalist in Ceylon
- Alexander Johnston (Scottish politician) (1790–1844)
- Alexander Keith Johnston (1804–1871), Scottish geographer
- Alexander Robert Johnston (1812–1888), British colonial official
- Alexander Johnston (artist) (1816–1891), Scottish painter
- Alexander Keith Johnston (1844–1879), Scottish geographer
- Alexander Johnston (footballer) (1881–1917), Scottish footballer
- Alexander Johnston (historian) (died 1889), American historian
- Alexander Johnston (Canadian politician) (1867–1951), Canadian journalist, civil servant and politician
- Alexander Johnston (Ontario politician), Canadian politician, Ontario MPP
- Alexander Johnston (British Army officer) (1884–1952), Hampshire cricketer and army officer
- Alexander Johnston (civil servant) (1905–1994), Scottish civil servant
- Alexander W. Johnston (died 1932), Member of the Legislative Council of Samoa
- Alex Johnston (Australian rules footballer) (1881–1965), Australian rules footballer
- Alex Johnston (rugby league) (born 1995), Australian professional rugby league footballer

== See also ==
- Alexander Johnson (disambiguation)
- Alexander Johnstone (disambiguation)
