= Alexandra Johnson =

Alexandra Johnson may refer to:

- Alexandra Johnson (Highlander), a character in the film Highlander III: The Sorcerer
- Alex Johnson (climber) (born 1989), full name Alexandra Johnson, American rock climber
- Alexandra Uteev Johnson (1946–2002), United States Foreign Service Officer
- Alexandra Johnson (athlete), Saint Lucian pole vaulter; see List of Saint Lucian records in athletics

== See also ==
- Alexzandra Johnson (born 1986), Canadian singer-songwriter
- Alexander Johnson (disambiguation), multiple people
