= Alex Johnstone =

Alex Johnstone may refer to:

- Alex Johnstone (footballer) (1896–1979), Scottish footballer
- Alex Johnstone (politician) (1961–2016), Scottish Conservative politician

== See also ==
- Alex Johnston (disambiguation)
