= Alexander Johnstone =

Alexander Johnstone may refer to:

- Sandy Johnstone (1916–2000), British air marshal
- Alex Johnstone (politician) (1961–2016), Scottish Conservative & Unionist politician
- Alex Johnstone (footballer) (1896–1979), Scottish footballer (Rangers, Hearts)

== See also ==
- Alexander Johnston (disambiguation)
- Alexander Johnson (disambiguation)
