= Emna Mizouni =

Tunisian activist and 2019 Wikimedian of the Year (born 1987)

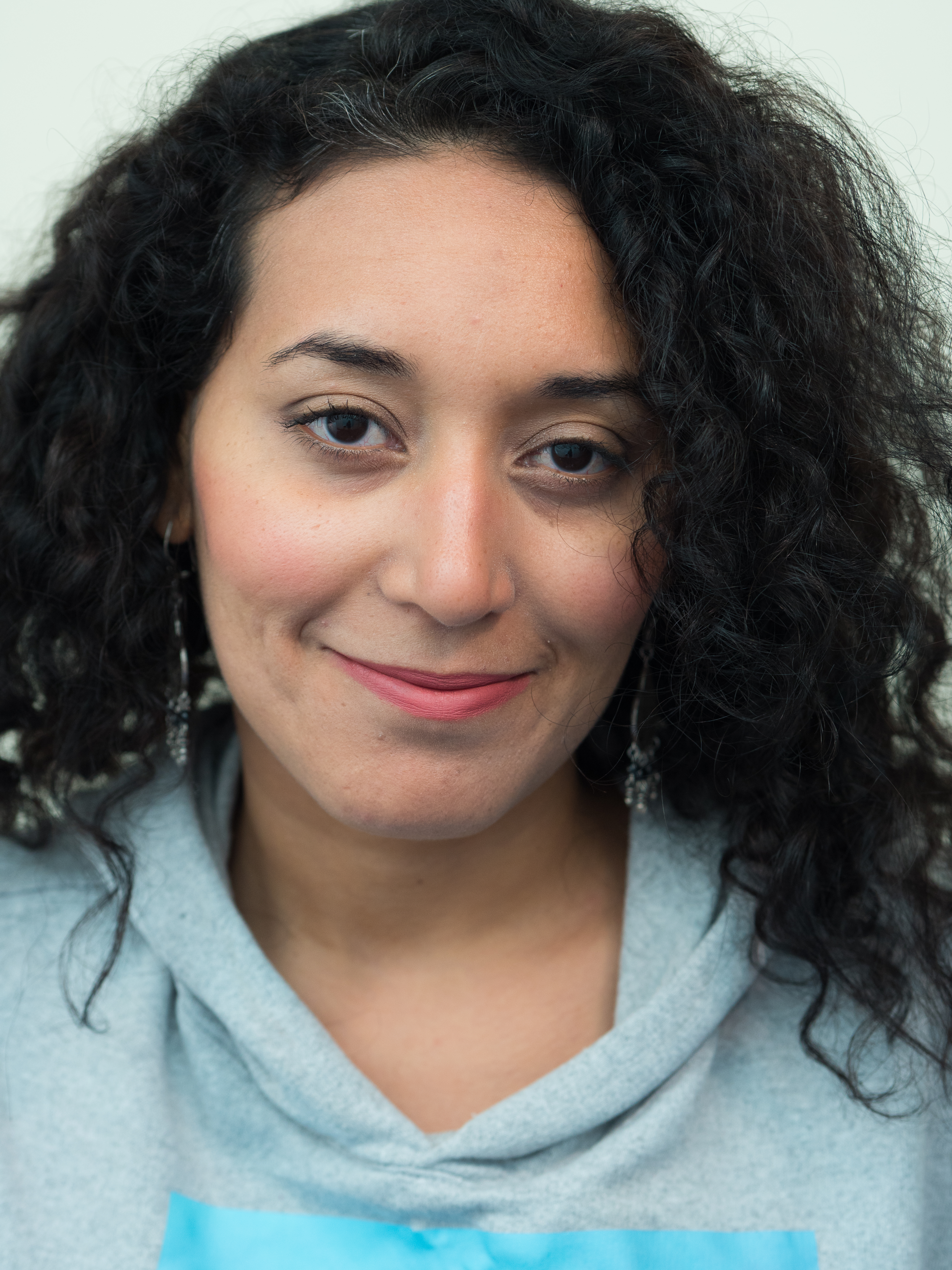
- Mizouni in 2019
- Born: 1987 (age 38–39)
- Occupations: Internet activist; human rights activist; journalist; communications expert; business executive; Wikimedian
- Spouse: Alex T. Johnson (m. 2020)
- Awards: Wikimedian of the Year (2019)

Emna Mizouni (Arabic: آمنة الميزوني, romanized: ʼĀmina Al-Mizūnī, pronounced [ʔaːmina almizuni]; born 1987) is a Tunisian internet and human rights activist, free-lance journalist, communications expert and business executive. In July 2019, After successfully helping to prepare RightsCon Tunis, Access Now, the international non-profit human rights group intent on an open Internet, announced her appointment to serve in their global board of directors. In March 2013, Mizouni founded Carthagina, an initiative designed to create interest in Tunisia's cultural heritage at home and abroad. In August 2019, she was honoured as Wikimedian of the Year at Wikimania, as a result of the leading role she has played in the development of Arab and African communities as well as her success in promoting the history and culture of Tunisia.

== Early life ==
Raised in Tunisia's capital, Tunis, Mizouni graduated from the Lycée Khaznadar in the Le Bardo district of the city in 2006. She then attended the École supérieure de commerce (ESCT) in Tunis where she first graduated in management (2009) and then went on to earn a master's degree in marketing, business negotiations, and communications (2011). After her studies, she worked in marketing and as a journalist and radio presenter. In June 2012, she was appointed Marketing and Communications Officer for the British Council.

== Career ==
In the aftermath of the Arab Spring, Mizouni was struck by the paucity of knowledge regarding Tunisian history and culture. As a result, together with other collaborators, she founded Carthagina (based on Carthage, the ancient name of Tunis) which was designed to promote Tunisia's cultural heritage. Professor Safwan Masri mentioned in his book Tunisia: An Arab Anomaly that while meeting Mizouni, she told him about the "significance after the Jasmine Revolution of Tunisians' consciousness of their varied and Mediterranean history as they chart their futures". In 2017, as head of the project, she explained: "After the revolution, lots of people wondered about the country's identity. Differing presentations of our history and culture showed how little we really knew about our rich cultural heritage." Together with Wikipedia and Wikimedia Commons, she organized photo contests focused on Tunisian heritage sites, succeeding in having participants submit hundreds of photographs in collaboration with Wikimedia's GLAM project. This led to Carthagina's project "MedinaPedia", allowing information about the Tunis Medina sites to be accessed on mobile phones via QR codes. Another GLAM project was set up by Mizouni's leadership; the Wikimedian in Residence in the Diocesan Library of Tunis, in partnership with the Library and the Archdiocese of Tunis signed by Tunisia's Archbishop Ilario Antoniazzi. Mizouni also saw Carthagina as an incentive for young people to show an interest in their country in a dynamic way, rather than by just following boring history lessons at school.

Emna Mizouni is also the representative of the Karama women's rights network for Tunisia and, with the support of Leila Ben-Gacem, Mizouni founded of the not-for-profit Digital Citizenship which facilitates access to information on digital literacy for marginalized groups. She served as a curator of Global Shapers, Tunis, which focuses on social business, citizenship and culture. In June 2020, Mizouni joined the Global Shapers Community's Racial Equity sub-committee.

After successfully helping to prepare RightsCon Tunis, a public announcement was made in July 2019 that she was appointed to serve on the global board of directors of Access Now, the international non-profit human rights group intent on an open Internet. In August 2019, at the Wikimedia Conference in Stockholm, she was honoured as Wikimedian of the Year 2019 as a result of the leading role she has played in the development of Arab and African communities as well as her success in promoting the history and culture of Tunisia.

Katherine Maher, Executive Director of the Wikimedia Foundation, complimented Mizouni on her efforts: "Emna is a tireless advocate and champion for free knowledge. Her work, collaboration, and passion to preserve Tunisia's cultural heritage has opened Tunisia’s culture, people, and history to the rest of the world."

== Selected publications ==
- Mizouni, Emna (2018). Evaluation de la stratégie de communication d'un nouveau media (in French). Editions universitaires européennes. ISBN 978-3-639-50786-7.

== Membership and fellowship ==
- Global Shapers Community Alumni Network
- International Visitors Leadership Program (NGO Management) – US Department of State.
- Board of Directors – AccessNow.
- Aspen Ideas Festival Fellow - Aspen Institute.
- Global Future Council (Human Rights) 2021 – World Economic Forum

=== Recognition ===
- Shuttleworth Foundation 2018 Grantee.
- Awarded by Jimmy Wales as Wikimedian of the Year 2019.
- UNWomen Yvonne-Hebert Awardee 2020.

== See also ==
- List of Wikipedia people
