= Alex T. Johnson =

American diplomat

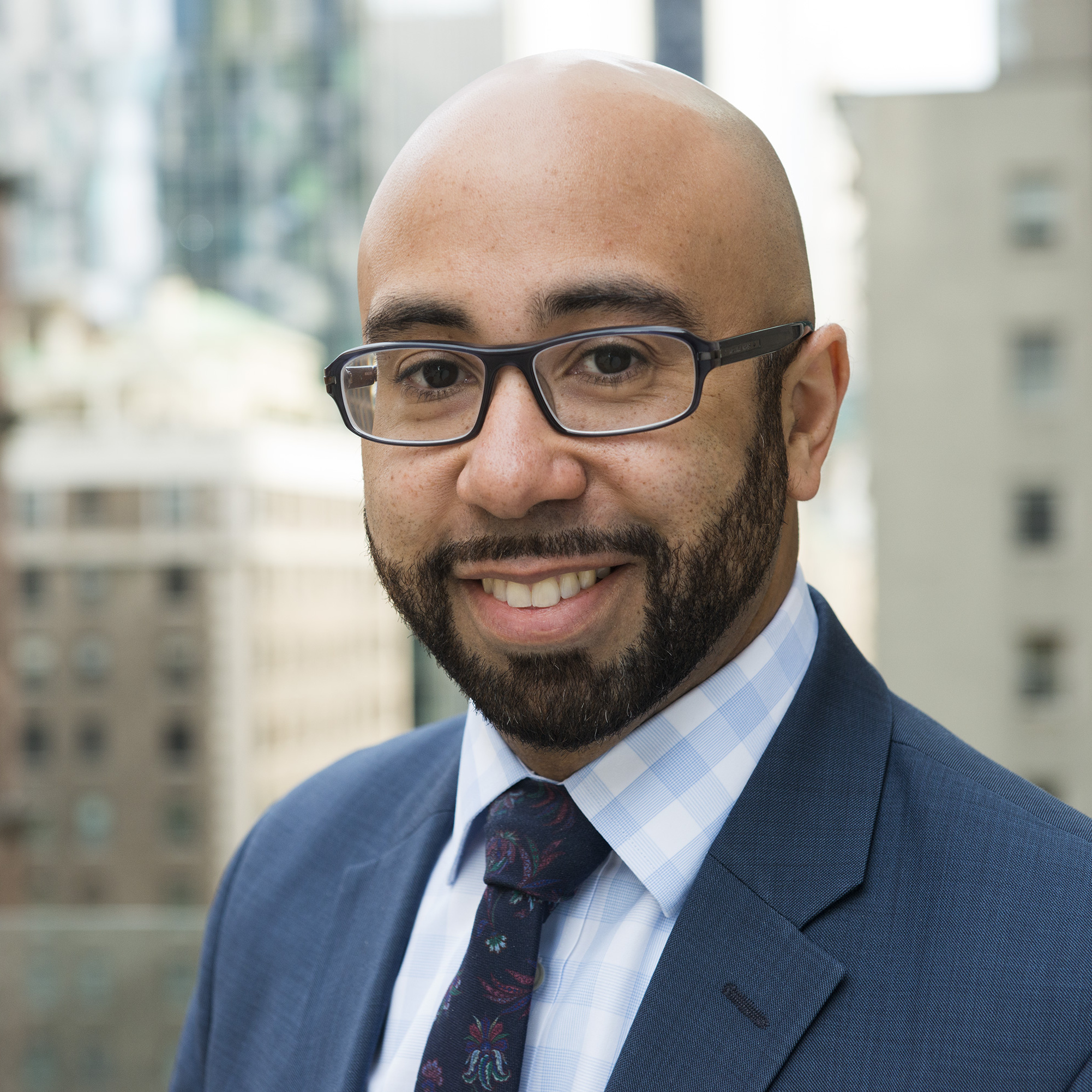

Chief of Staff, U.S. Helsinki Commission
- In office February 2019 – January 2021
- Preceded by: Kyle Parker
- Succeeded by: Mischa E. Thompson (Acting)

Personal details
- Born: Alex Thomas Johnson
- Party: Democratic
- Spouse: Emna Mizouni (m. 2020)
- Education: Oregon State University (BS, MPP)

Alex Thomas Johnson is an American foreign policy advisor. He was the first African-American chief of staff of the U.S. Helsinki Commission since its establishment in 1976.

== Education ==
Alex T. Johnson, originally from Portland, holds a BS in natural resources then an MPP in 2006 both from Oregon State University.

== Career ==
Alex T. Johnson focuses on Inclusive Foreign Policy and Transatlantic Security. He was appointed to the Helsinki Commission in 2019 by U.S. Representative Alcee Hastings.

Johnson was the Policy Advisor of the OSCE from November 2007 to September 2015 in Vienna. Then he moved to Open Society Foundations in Washington, D.C. in the position of Senior Policy Advisor for Europe and Eurasia. He is also a former Obama Administration appointee at the Department of Defense, serving as Special Advisor for Russia/Ukraine External Affairs in the Office of the Under Secretary of Defense (Policy) from October 2015 to January 2017. He was among the founders of the Transatlantic Democracy Platform aimed at countering erosion of democratic institutions in Central Europe and related security implications for the NATO. Part of his mission was International Elections Observations in Azerbaijan in 2010, Albania in 2009 and 2013, the 2011 Constituent Assembly election in Tunisia, Turkey in 2015 and Ukraine in 2010 and 2015

He was a Congressional Black Caucus Foundation fellow in the office of U.S. Representative Alcee L. Hastings and a consultant for local government initiatives in Portland, Oregon.

In January 2021, Johnson returned to the Open Society Foundations taking a role in their Eurasia Program.

== Honors ==
For his accomplishments and work, he was nominated in 2019 an Aspen Ideas Festival fellow. During the celebrations of Juneteenth in 2020, Alex T. Johnson was among the Black National Security and Foreign Policy community celebrated in the Diversity in National Security Network's Black Voices campaign by Senior Brookings Fellow Amanda Sloat and Amb. Barbara A. Leaf. He is a Term Member at the Council on Foreign Relations.
