= Leila Ben-Gacem =

Tunisian social entrepreneur

Leila Ben-Gacem Arabic: ليلى بن قاسم
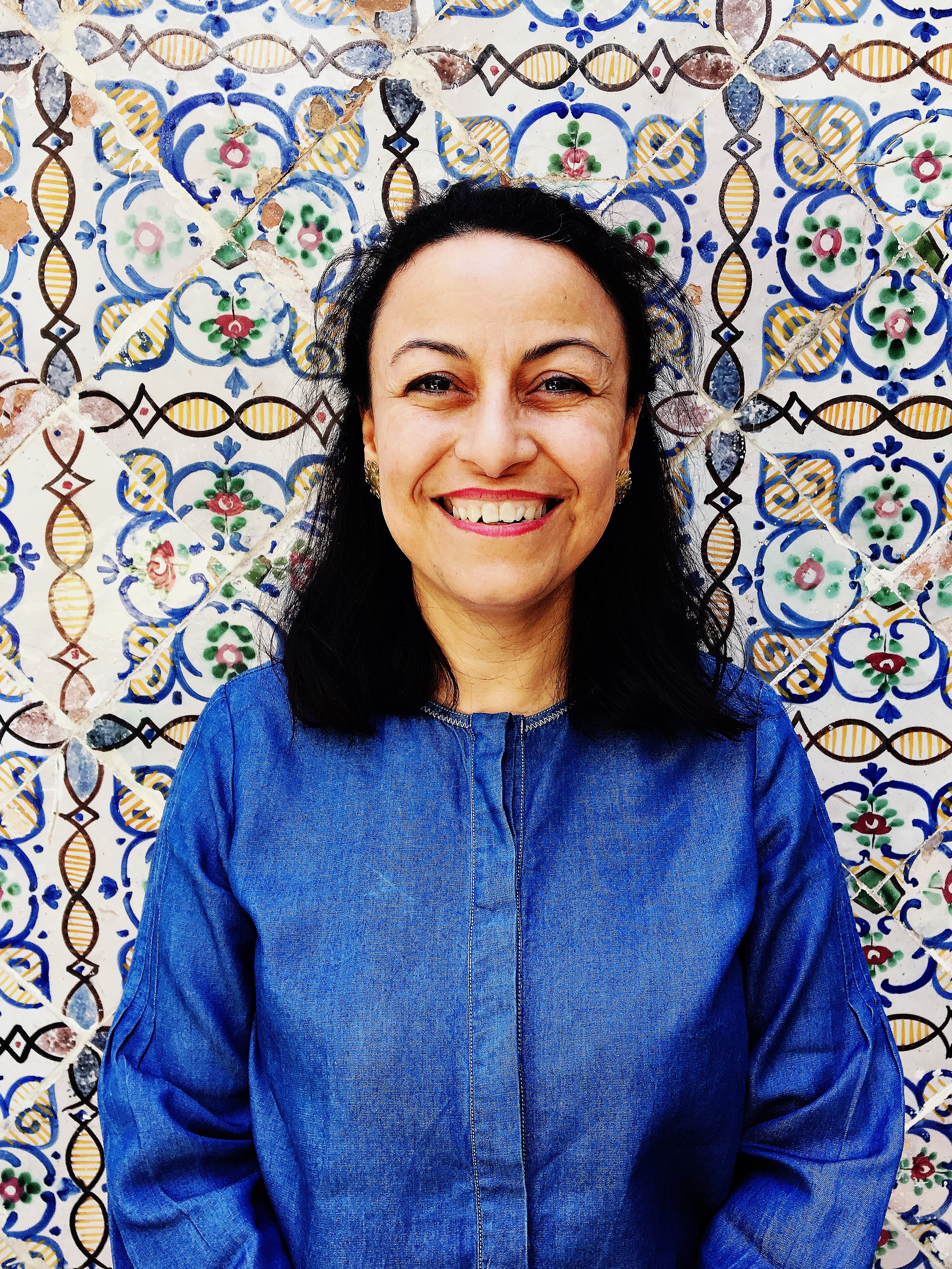
- Born: 1969 (age 56–57)
- Education: Social Entrepreneur and municipal councillor
- Known for: Entrepreneurship

Leila Ben-Gacem (Arabic: ليلى بن قاسم) is a Tunisian social entrepreneur. She is the founder of Blue Fish company and the initiator and founder of several initiatives in the Tunisian ecosystem and cultural scenes through Tunisian Civil Society. Ben-Gacem is also an elected member of the municipal council of Beni Khalled since Tunisia's first decentralized municipal elections were held in 2018.

== Biography ==
Ben-Gacem studied biomedical engineering at Boston University. She worked in many companies such as IMM in Tunisia, Hewlett-Packard in Germany, Assada Medical in Libya.

In 2006, she started the social enterprise Blue Fish to help Tunisian artisans, particularly women, to export their works and develop their businesses. In 2009, she initiated Sougha Est in the khalifa fund for enterprise development in Abu Dhabi in the UAE. She occupied the position of Senior Manager at the Khalifa Fund for Enterprise Development, helping Emirati women artisans in developing their local enterprises, until 2013 when she decided to go back to Tunisia.

In 2013, Leila founded Dar Ben-Gacem, a boutique hotel and a social enterprise. The guest house's main objective is to contribute to the development of the Medina of Tunis. Ben-Gacem was elected, in the period of 2014-2016, as a board member of Edhiafa Association that deals with the network of boutique hotels in Tunisia. Before that, she was a board member in CJD (Centre des Jeunes Dirigeants) - Young CEO Centre until 2009.

=== Civic engagement and social change ===
Ben-Gacem is known as a socio-cultural catalyst. She has been involved in many cultural initiatives to revive the Medina of Tunis and ensure its sustainable development. In 2015, Leila and other civil society actors played a major role in reviving the Rachidia association in its 80th anniversary, then she joined other cultural initiatives such as Journal de la Médina, the national Wikipedia project MedinaPedia and the first Light Festival in Africa Interference.

In 2015 as well, she has led a national campaign to revive the industry and usage of the Chachia. Leila occupied the position of President of the Association of Preservation of Beni Khalled from 2015 until 2018. She is also a founding member of the Ultramarathon Association in Tunisia since 2017, where they organised the first Ultramarathon, UltraMirage in Nefta in the south of Tunisia.

In 2017, Ben-Gacem founded the first co-working space in the Medina of Tunis, entitled Dar El Harka, intended as a hub for creative industries. Ben-Gacem joined Emna Mizouni in founding Digital Citizenship organization to advance the knowledge and skills of women entrepreneurs.

Ben-Gacem ran for civic office in the 2018 Tunisian municipal elections, as part of a list of independent candidates with the slogan "Ghodwa Khir - Tomorrow is better". She was elected to the Beni Khalled municipality. Later, she was appointed the head of the finance committee. She also joined the network of women municipal counsellors in the Maghreb region along with Souad Abderrahim and other women municipal councillors.

=== Recognition ===
Ben-Gacem received Fatma El Fehria Award in 2017. In the same year, she received the Women Entrepreneur in Cultural Sector Award as well. Prior to that, in October 2016, she became an Ashoka Fellow.
