= Alexander Johnston (footballer) =

Scottish footballer

Personal information
- Full name: Alexander Brown Johnston
- Date of birth: 1881
- Place of birth: Falkirk, Scotland
- Date of death: 17 August 1917 (aged 36)
- Place of death: West Flanders, Belgium
- Positions: Outside right; inside left

Senior career*
Years	Team	Apps	(Gls)
–1899	Falkirk Amateurs		
1899–1900	Falkirk	0	(0)
–1904	Camelon Juniors		
1904–1906	Falkirk	5	(1)
- * Club domestic league appearances and goals

Alexander Brown Johnston (1881 – 17 August 1917) was a Scottish professional footballer who played in the Scottish League for Falkirk as an outside right. He was nicknamed 'Spinner'.

== Personal life ==
Johnston worked for the Post Office for 20 years. He served as an acting bombardier in the Royal Garrison Artillery during the First World War and was killed in action in West Flanders on 17 August 1917. He was buried in Bard Cottage Cemetery, north of Ypres.

== Career statistics ==
Appearances and goals by club, season and competition
Club	Season	League			National Cup		Total	
Club	Season	Division	Apps	Goals	Apps	Goals	Apps	Goals
Falkirk	1904–05	Scottish Second Division	5	1	0	0	5	1
Career total			5	1	0	0	5	1
