= Alexander Johnston (businessman) =

Scottish mill owner (1774–1864)

- Born: December 1774
- Died: March 1864 (aged 89)

Alexander Johnston (31 December 1774 – 16 March 1864) was a Scottish mill owner and woollen manufacturer who founded the luxury woollen company Johnstons of Elgin in Elgin in 1797.

== Early life and career ==
Alexander Johnston was born at Ardiffray Farm in the Parish of Cruden, near Aberdeen, on Hogmanay 1774. His father Thomas Johnston was a farmer, and his mother Barbara Johnston (nee Sangster) helped to supplement the family income through bleaching linen and spinning yarn.He was the youngest of six children, by some twenty years, with three older brothers having died in infancy and two surviving sisters.

At the age of fourteen Johnston was apprenticed to a cousin in Aberdeen who ran a successful chemist shop, but this was short lived as the fumes from the chemicals made him ill. He was then apprenticed to another cousin in Newborough, but their business is not known.

In 1789 Johnston travelled to London with an uncle who bought and sold yarn.

It is estimated that Johnston arrived in Elgin around 1791. His first job was foreman at the linen bleach works at Deanshaugh and a few years later he purchased a small woollen manufactory from Messrs Robertson and Forsyth where he established the firm of Alexander Johnston, later Johnstons of Elgin, in 1797. He started with the sale of linen, tobacco, snuff and meal. In 1800, with financial assistance from his sister Barbara, Johnston leased a small meal mill at Newmill, in Elgin, from a Mr King and began to erect machinery for carding wool with slubbing and spinning jennies. He applied to the local Town Council for a grant of £100 to invest in this machinery, which he received in 1807.

== Career ==
Johnston began to take in wool from local farms, card and spin it and then sell it back to the farmers for weaving. By 1811 he had purchased the necessary machinery to process the wool from raw fibre to finished cloth all on one site making Newmill 'vertically' integrated.

In the early days of the business all of Johnston's goods were transported by Alexander on a small gig, travelling the length and breadth of the country. As early as 1799 he started investing in shipping when he purchased a one-eighth share in the Marquis of Huntly and in 1803 he added two sloops, the Eliza and the Elizabeth, to his list of investments.

Johnston's products tended towards rougher woollen cloths such as 'duffles' and 'kersies' produced for durability. His main trade was amongst local merchants, drapers and tailors. In 1813 he took the risk to send a consignment of cloths to Nova Scotia, but this came in at a loss of £19 11s 6d. Further international sales followed, with a better success rate.

Johnston steadily built his business throughout the early 19th century. By the late 1830s his mill at Newmill was a successful woollens manufactory, having phased out the tobacco, linen and other goods over the years. Johnston was successful in securing the patronage of the Duke of Richmond to weave his estate tweed in 1844, still worn today by the ghillies on the River Spey and at Gordon Castle. Estate Tweeds were first designed in the 1840s and Johnstons of Elgin became one of the earliest suppliers. They wove the first Lovat mixture in 1845 and the Super Balmoral in 1853

Alexander Johnston retired in 1846.

== Family and personal life ==
Married first Marjory 'May' Anderson 22 December 1805, but she died a year later leaving a six-month-old daughter, Margaret. He then married Mary McAndrew on 24 September 1814, they had seven daughters and one son, James Johnston (1815–1897).

Johnston and his family lived at Newmill House, built in the grounds of the mill in the early 19th century.

== Death ==
Alexander Johnston died on 16 March 1864 in Elgin. He is buried in the Elgin Cathedral Cemetery.

== Legacy ==
Alexander's son James Johnston took over the business when his father retired in 1846. In 1920 the business was sold to Edward Stroud Harrison, a colleague of Alexander's grandson Charles, and remains in Harrison family ownership today. Johnstons of Elgin still operates out of the same site at Newmill with a further knitwear mill in Hawick, acquired in 1980. Newmill is the only surviving vertical weaving mill in Scotland today. The company holds a royal warrant of appointment for the manufacture of Estate Tweeds, Knitwear and Woven Accessories.
