= Alix Mathon =

Haitian novelist, lawyer, politician, and journalist

Alix Mathon (9 October 1908 – 4 May 1985) was a Haitian novelist, lawyer, politician, and journalist. He received the France-Haïti prize for his novel La Fin des Baïonnettes, which described the events leading up to the United States' occupation of Haiti. Other notable novels by Mathon are Le Drapeau en Berne (1974), Témoignages sur les Evénements de 1957, and La Reléve de Charlemagne.
