= Alex Johnson (firefighter) =

British firefighter (born 1967)

Alex Johnson QFSM
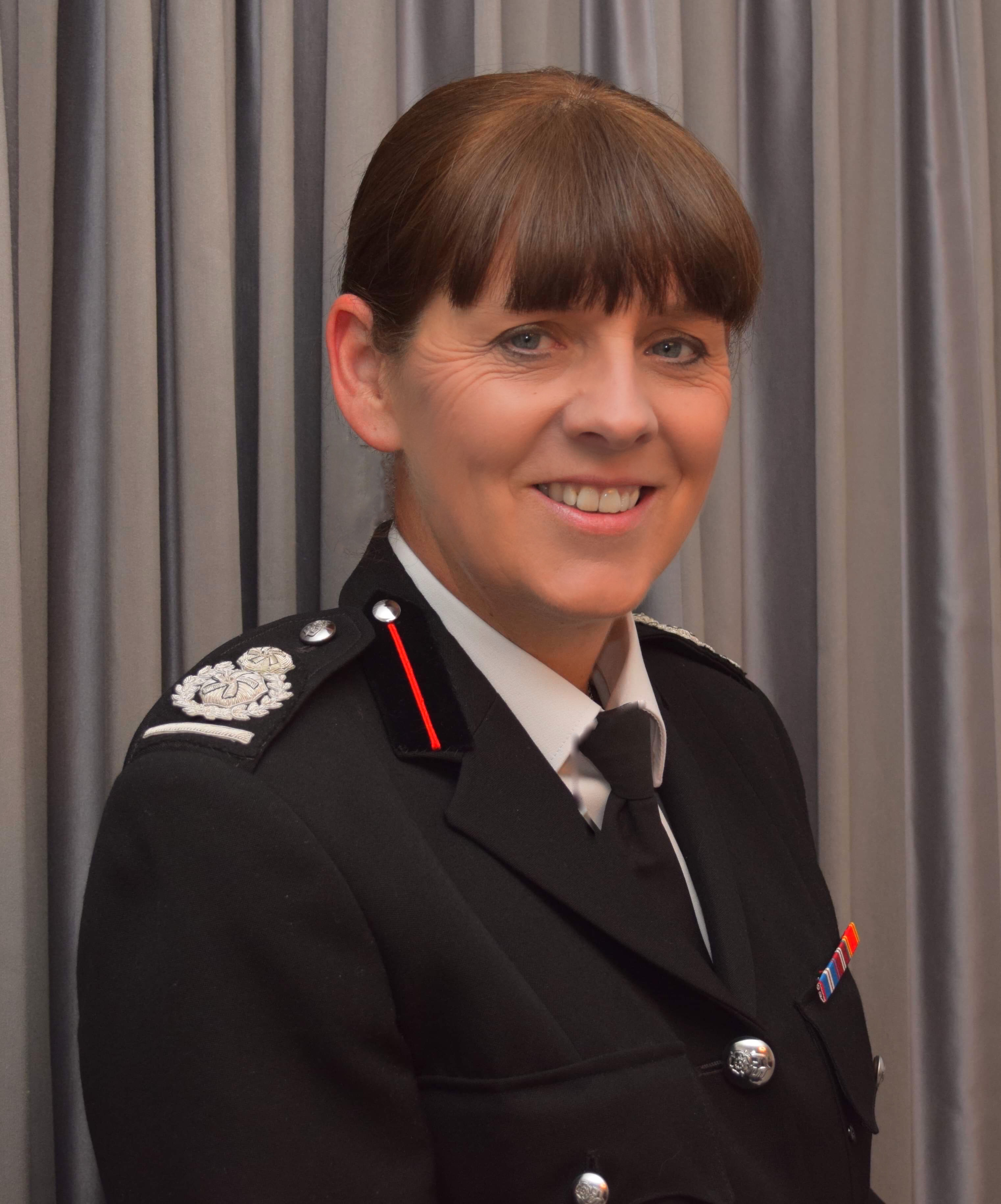

Chief fire officer

Personal details
- Occupation: Firefighter

Alex Johnson QFSM (born 1967) is a British firefighter, named the "Most Influential Woman in Fire" at the Excellence in Fire and Emergency Awards in December 2019. In January 2020, she started serving as the chief fire officer of South Yorkshire Fire and Rescue Authority (SYFRA). When Johnson started out as a firefighter in Derbyshire in 1992, aged 24, only 1% of firefighters in the UK were women. She said: "I never saw another female firefighter from one month to the next, there were so few of us."

== Career ==
Alex Johnson joined South Yorkshire Fire and Rescue as Assistant Chief Fire Officer in 2017, before being promoted to Deputy Chief Fire Officer in December 2017. She had previously served with Derbyshire Fire and Rescue Service for over 25 years, having joined as a firefighter in 1992. At Derbyshire, she served at stations across the county and rose to the rank of Area Manager. She led the service's prevention, protection and inclusion work. She also worked at Derbyshire Fire and Rescue Service's training centre, as a Breathing Apparatus Instructor and a Group Manager for learning and development. She is a qualified Fire Protection Officer.

Johnson is a member of the National Executive Committee of Women in the Fire Service (UK), a not-for-profit organisation that aims to inspire, enable and develop women with the Service. In the early 1990s, she attended her first Women in the Fire Service UK conference and the Fire Brigades Union women's school.

Johnson highlighted those two events as a turning point, finding other women who had had similar experiences to her, and giving her a support network across the UK. She met women who held rank and realised she could make things change for the better, for both women and men in the service. She has a passion for supporting other women, and mentors women within and outside of the fire service. She has also re-established South Yorkshire's equality and inclusion group.

== Awards and honours ==
In December 2019, Johnson was awarded Most Influential Woman in Fire at the Excellence in Fire and Emergency Awards. In November 2019, she was runner-up in the Public Service category of the Guardian Leadership Excellence Awards.

She was awarded the Queen's Fire Service Medal in the 2021 Birthday Honours.
