= Hibaaq Osman =

Hibaaq Osman هيباق عثمان
- Born: Somaliland
- Occupation: political strategist
- Title: Head of the ThinkTank for Arab Women, the Dignity Fund, El-Karama, and the Centre for the Strategic Initiatives of Women

Hibaaq Osman (Somali: Hibaaq Cismaan, Arabic: هيباق عثمان) is a Somali global political strategist. She founded and serves as the Chairperson of the ThinkTank for Arab Women, the Dignity Fund, El-Karama, and the Centre for the Strategic Initiatives of Women.

== Personal life ==
Osman was born in Somalia. She studied locally, as well as in Ethiopia, Sudan, and the United States. She has also lived and worked in Yemen.

== Career ==
=== Fund for Peace ===
Osman has extensive experience working with civil society. Since 1992, she has served as the Director of Communications for the Fund for Peace. She was also the Chairperson of the Center for the Advancement of Somali Women and Children based in Washington, D.C., which was established as a corporation later the same year.

=== El-Karama ===
Osman currently serves as a Special Representative to Africa for V-Day, a global movement to halt violence against women and girls. She has since 2002 directed the body's activities in Africa, the Middle East and Asia. To this end, Osman has led delegations to establish multi-sectoral collaborations with local women activists in Egypt, Sudan, Tunisia, Morocco, Palestine, Jordan, Lebanon, Afghanistan, India, Thailand and Korea.

In 2005, she founded the El-Karama program within V-Day, serving as its CEO. The non-governmental organization works to protect women's rights in the Arab world. Headquartered in Cairo, it has a robust network spanning fourteen countries in the MENA region, including Somalia. El-Karama collaborates with average citizens, community leaders, politicians, legislators, activists and young academics among others to support general women's development, protection and security, as well as to abolish or reform any discriminatory regulations and practices. Since its establishment, the organization has had an impact in various fields, including capacity-building, knowledge exchange and advocacy. El-Karama has also had an effect on national, regional and international policymaking. A number of its official recommendations have been relayed by the UN and other international agencies, as well as adopted into extant and new constitutions. Through the program, Osman launched the Libyan Women's Platform for Peace in 2011 and the Syrian Women's Forum for Peace the following year. She also participated in the Norwegian Forum for Women and Development (FOKUS Kvinner)'s No Women, No Peace! campaign in 2013. El-Karama is likewise partnered with the Inter Press Service (IPS)'s MDG3 Fund, which was set up by the Dutch Ministry for Development Cooperation.

=== Centre for the Strategic Initiatives of Women ===
Additionally, Osman is the founder and Director of the Centre for the Strategic Initiatives of Women (CSIW). Through the non-governmental organization, she has advocated for democracy, human rights and women's participation in conflict resolution. She concurrently founded the SIHA network ("outcry" in Arabic), which unites various women's groups in the Horn of Africa in order to leverage their impact on public influence and community leadership.

=== Coalition for Peace in the Horn of Africa ===
Osman was also one of the founders of the Coalition for Peace in the Horn of Africa. Among other initiatives, the think tank urged the U.S. authorities to adopt a positive foreign policy toward Africa. It also lobbied the American government to withdraw financial support for oppressive regimes.

=== ThinkTank for Arab Women and Dignity Fund ===
In addition, Osman established and serves as the Chairperson of the ThinkTank for Arab Women (TTfAW). The Cairo-based NGO consists of domestic, national and international experts in women's rights. Osman likewise founded and heads the Dignity Fund regional non-governmental organization.

== Memberships and fellowships ==
Besides her CEO and ambassador duties, Osman serves on the board of a number of organizations, including Ashoka Arab World, Africa Action, Equality Now, the Advisory Council for the Global Fund for Women, Donor Direct Action, and the Advisory Council for Omega Women's Leadership Center.

She is a member of the Expert Committee for Peace and Security at the League of Arab States, the Committee on the Elimination of Discrimination against Women, and the UN Women's Global Civil Society Advisory Group. Osman is also a senior fellow at the Academy for Political Leadership and Participation at the University of Maryland.

== Awards ==
In 2009, Osman was named among The 500 Most Influential Muslims by the Prince Alwaleed Center for Muslim–Christian Understanding at Georgetown University.
