= Alix Bancourt =

French fashion blogger

Alix Bancourt is a fashion blogger who goes by the name The Cherry Blossom Girl. She is based in Paris, France. The title of Bancourt's blog, The Cherry Blossom Girl, comes from the French band Air's song "Cherry Blossom Girl". Her blog is written in French and translated to English by Victoria Morrison.

Bancourt is a fashion school graduate who interned for Chloé and Alexander McQueen before starting her site in 2007. Her style is known for its use of pastels, flower prints and whimsical colors. Bancourt designs most of the clothing she wears. In 2010, photographer Scott Schuman took a picture of Bancourt during Paris Fashion Week that Crate & Barrel later used in a marketing campaign.

Bancourt has released a lingerie line, entitled "Miranda", in collaboration with Etam.
