= Amanda Sloat =

American political scientist

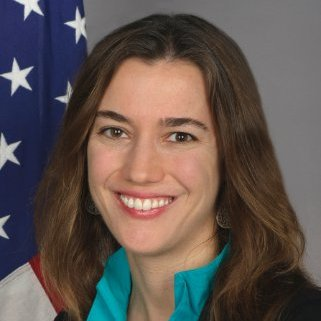
- Sloat in 2013

Personal details
- Education: University of Edinburgh
- Occupation: International relations advisor, professor
- Awards: Royal Order of the Polar Star, Commander Grand Cross; Order of Merit, 3rd degree

Amanda Sloat is an American political scientist and writer who served as a special assistant to United States president Joe Biden. A senior director at the National Security Council's division for European affairs under Biden, she previously worked as senior adviser for the Middle East and North Africa in the Obama administration. She has taught at the IE University's School of Politics, Economics, and Global Affairs.

Sloat was awarded a Commander 1st Class of the Royal Order of the Polar Star by the king of Sweden in 2024, and an Order of Merit of the third grade by Ukrainian president Volodymyr Zelenskyy in 2022. She is the author of Scotland in Europe: A Study of Multi-Level Governance (2002). Sloat has hosted the Power & Purpose podcast.

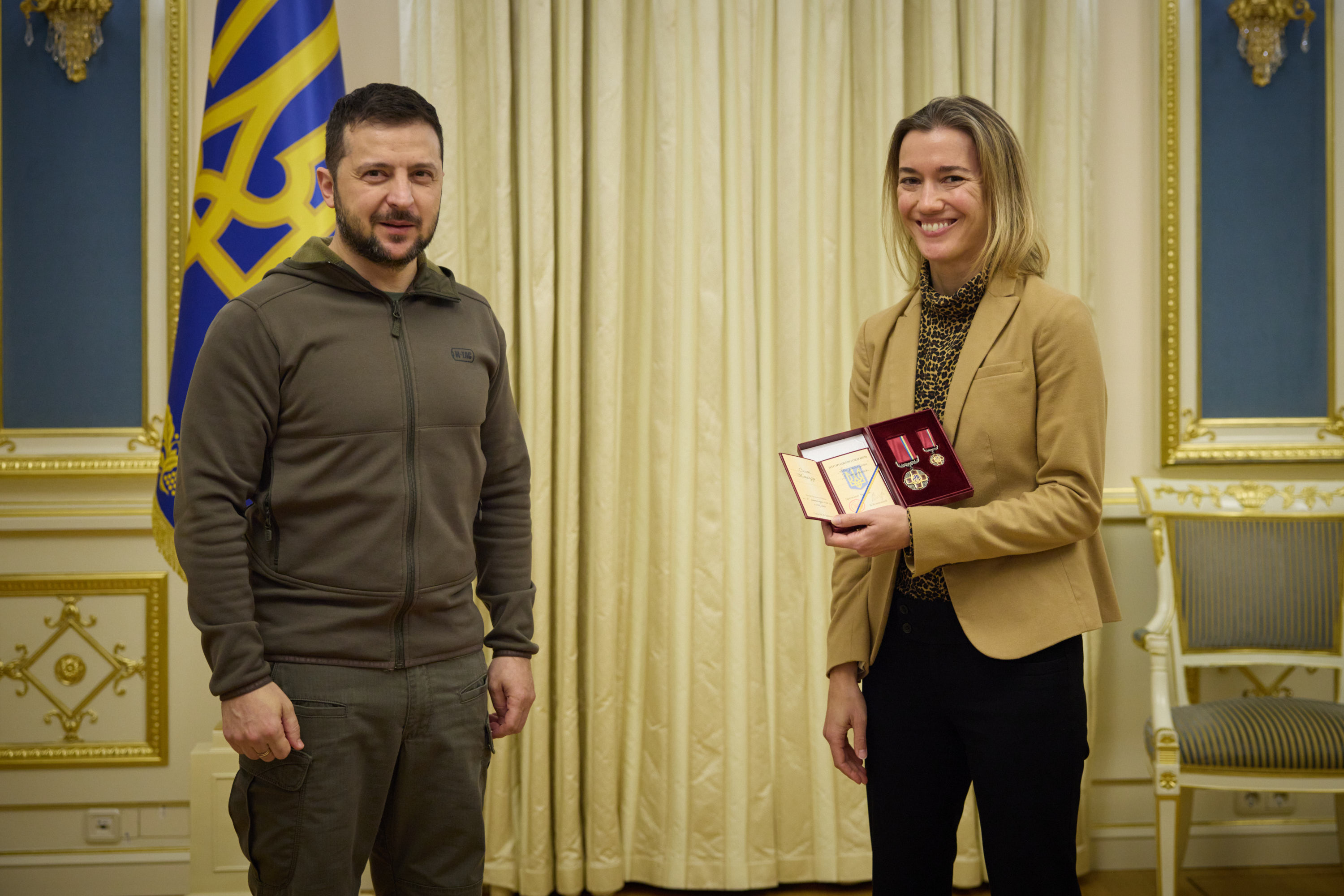
Sloat receiving a Ukrainian Order of Merit of the third class from Volodymyr Zelenskyy, November 2022

She was described by Politico as a "driving force" in promoting the Bucharest Nine in Europe. She also articulated the United States' response to Russia's invasion of Ukraine. Sloat is a senior fellow of the Brookings Institution.
