= Alex Johnson (footballer, born 1917) =

English footballer (1917–1944)

Personal information
- Full name: Alexander Johnson
- Date of birth: 5 December 1917
- Place of birth: Gateshead, England
- Date of death: 31 July 1944 (aged 26)
- Place of death: south of Salalah, Oman
- Position: Full back

Senior career*
Years	Team	Apps	(Gls)
1937	Birtley		
1938–1939	Norwich City	5	(0)
- * Club domestic league appearances and goals

Alexander Johnson (5 December 1917 – 31 July 1944) was an English professional footballer who played as a full back in the Football League for Norwich City.

== Personal life ==
Johnson was married. He served as a corporal in the Royal Air Force Volunteer Reserve during the Second World War. Johnson was killed on 31 July 1944 aboard Douglas Dakota KG690 when the aircraft crashed into a mountain 48 km (30 mi) south of Salalah, Oman. His body was never recovered, and he is commemorated at the Alamein Memorial.

== Career statistics ==
Appearances and goals by club, season and competition
Club	Season	League			FA Cup		Total	
Club	Season	Division	Apps	Goals	Apps	Goals	Apps	Goals
Norwich City	1938–39	Second Division	5	0	0	0	5	0
Career total			5	0	0	0	5	0
