= Alexandra Uteev Johnson =

United States Foreign Service Officer (1946–2002)

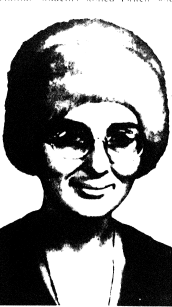
- Alexandra Uteev Johnson, c. 1972
- Born: August 9, 1946; Sacramento, California
- Died: October 12, 2002 (aged 56); Enid, Oklahoma
- Education: University of California, Davis; University of California, Los Angeles
- Occupation: Foreign Service Officer
- Known for: Reporting alleged physical abuse of Palestinian detainees by Israeli authorities.
- Parent(s): Thais Uteev Johnson (1914 – 2017); George Levoy Johnson (1915 – 1989)

Alexandra Uteev "Alix" Johnson (August 9, 1946 – October 12, 2002) was a United States Foreign Service Officer from 1972 to 1979. She is notable for the controversy that arose in 1979 over two reports that she wrote alleging that Israeli authorities systematically used physical abuse to interrogate Palestinian detainees.

== Early life and career ==
Born in Sacramento, California, Johnson graduated from the University of California, Davis with a degree in history in 1967 and received an M.A. in political science from the University of California, Los Angeles in 1970. As a Foreign Service Officer she worked as an analyst in the Department of State's Bureau of Intelligence and Research specializing in Soviet relations with Arab countries. She received Arabic language training from 1975 to 1977 in Beirut and Tunis and was assigned in February 1977 to the United States Consulate General in Jerusalem as vice-consul and post visa officer.

In her work as a visa officer Johnson investigated 29 "visa security cases" involving Palestinians seeking entry into the United States who had been convicted by Israeli military courts of being members of illegal organizations, including the Palestine Liberation Organization (PLO). Individuals found to be terrorists would be barred by law from entering the United States. According to Johnson, all 29 individuals she interviewed gave similar accounts of being beaten or tortured by Israeli interrogators.

== "Jerusalem 1500" controversy ==
Department of State cable denying that U.S. officials knew of or consented to alleged Israeli surveillance of Alexandra U. Johnson in Jerusalem

In May 1978, Johnson's superiors at the consulate approved her draft of a cable to the Department of State describing the abusive interrogation methods that her interviewees claimed that Israeli authorities had used, including "beating with sticks and whips, prolonged immersion in cold water, hanging by the hands and sexual sadism." Classified "confidential," the cable was designated "Jerusalem 1500." It was followed in November by "Jerusalem 3239," classified "secret," in which Johnson concluded that physical mistreatment of Arab detainees in the West Bank was a "systematic practice" of Israeli authorities. Returning to Washington in January 1979, Johnson was denied promotion, which led to her automatic dismissal from the Foreign Service for not achieving promotion within her mandatory six-year "probationary" period as a junior officer. Johnson later told The New York Times that she believed her human rights reporting was what led to her dismissal, a charge that the Department of State denied.

On February 7, 1979, The Washington Post published a story about Johnson's cables, indicating that they had influenced the Department of State's decision to describe Israeli abuse of Arab detainees as a "systematic practice" in its annual human rights country report on Israel sent to Congress a few days earlier. Time magazine later reported that Israel's security agency Shin Bet, with the approval of Federal Bureau of Investigation attachés at the United States Embassy in Tel Aviv, had put Johnson under surveillance and wiretapped her telephone while she was still posted to Jerusalem. In a cable to the American Embassy in Tel Aviv and the American Consulate General in Jerusalem, the Department of State denied that American authorities had either received or consented to such a request. Time also reported Shin Bet's allegations that Johnson was involved with terrorists.

Johnson was briefly engaged to be married to one of the alleged torture victims whom she interviewed for her reports. Explaining the relationship to The New York Times, Johnson said that after the man received his visa and went to the United States, he wrote her a letter proposing marriage and that she accepted after visiting him in Chicago in 1978. Johnson said that she broke off the engagement after a few weeks and had not had any contact with her former fiancé since then.

The Israeli embassy in Washington, D.C., "categorically denied" the allegations in Johnson's cables.

== Post-controversy career and death ==
External images
- Alexandra Uteev Johnson (front row, center) at a family reunion in 1994.
- Alexandra Uteev Johnson (far right) at a family reunion in 1994. Both images displayed at Wilks-Wilkes Reunions: Descendants of Benjamin C. Wilks & Harriet Young, 1947-present.

Following the controversy over her cables, Johnson became a court reporter and professional genealogist. She died in Enid, Oklahoma, in 2002.

== Monographs by Alexandra Uteev Johnson ==
- Johnson, Alexandra U. (1979). Israeli Torture of Palestinian Political Prisoners in Jerusalem and the West Bank: Three State Department Reports. Public Affairs Series No. 14. New York: Americans for Middle East Understanding. OCLC 006311020.
- Johnson, Alexandra Uteev (1997). A Union Soldier's Story, Crafting your Ancestor's Military Biography: With a Sample Biography & Regimental History of 2nd U.S. Reserve Corps of Missouri. Enid, OK: Alexandra Johnson Court Reporting Service. OCLC 49631023.
- Johnson, Alexandra Uteev; Westensee, Betty Ruth Ferong (1999). Watrous, Watrus, Waters Family Bibles. Enid, OK: A.U. Johnson. OCLC 46947540.
- Johnson, Alexandra Uteev. Preliminary Census History of Walter Watrus (Sr.) and His Descendants: With Additional Documents. Enid, OK: Alexandra U. Johnson. OCLC 732906243.
- Johnson, Alexandra Uteev; Daughters of Union Veterans of the Civil War, 1861-1865. Sallie Peacheater Tent 18 (2001). Another Album of Ancestors. Oklahoma City, OK: Oklahoma Historical Society. OCLC 52425650.
