= Rose (given name) =

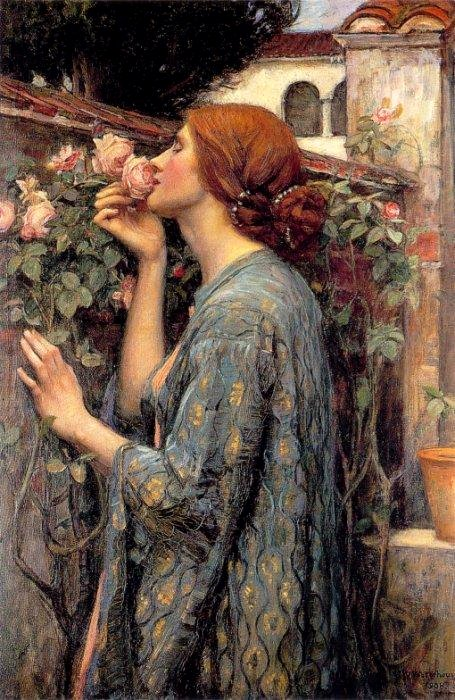
- The Soul of the Rose by John William Waterhouse.
- Gender: Female

Origin
- Origin: Germanic or Latin
- Meaning: "fame-kind" or derived from the flower name.
- Region of origin: Germanic countries (Germany, England, Scotland, the Netherlands, Scandinavian region) or Roman Empire (Latin)

Other names
- See also: Robert, Roger, Rudolph, Roland, Roderick, Rodney

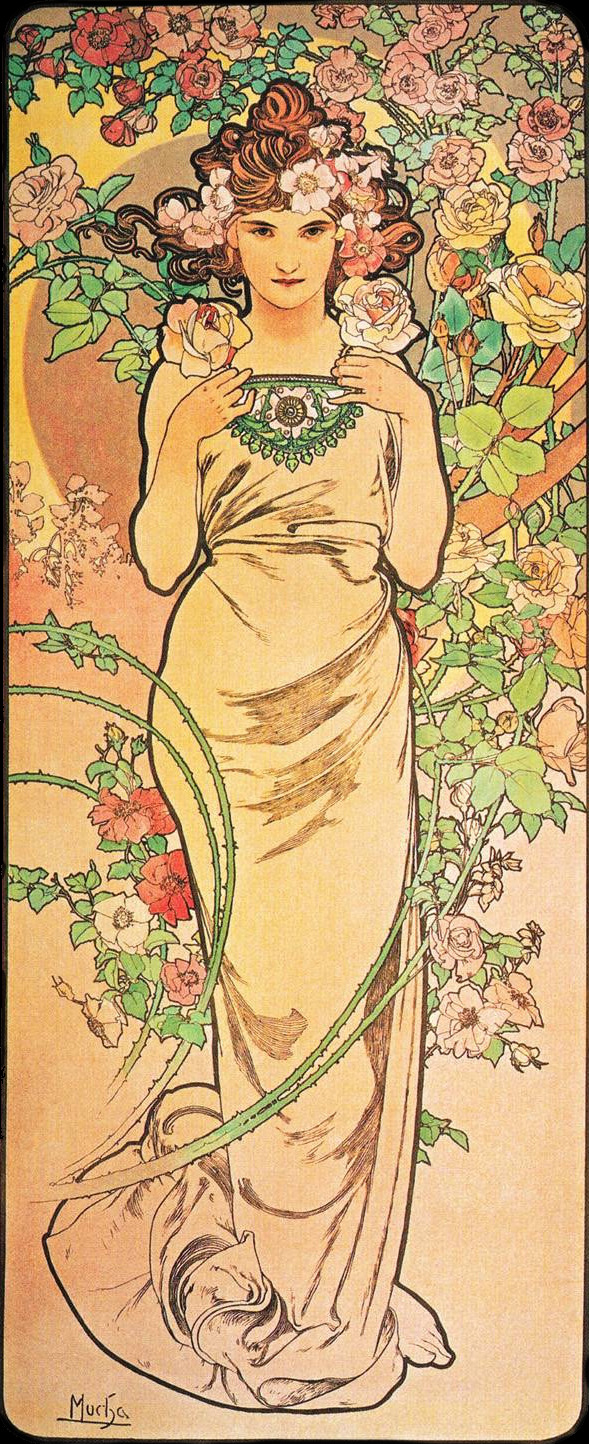
The Rose, an 1898 Art Nouveau illustration by Alfons Mucha.

Rose is a female given name. It is a late Latin name derived from rosa, meaning "rose". Variants are Rosa, Rosario, Rosie, Rosalba, Rosalie, Rosalia, Rosina, Rosaria, Rosalyn and Rosalina. Similar names are Rosanna and Rosamunde. It may be a short form of Rosemary, Roseanne and Rosemond.

== History ==
Rose was originally a Norman form of a German name Hrodheid, composed of the words Hrod ("fame") and Heid ("kind", "type"). It was originally spelled (by the Normans) Roese or Rohese. It was used in England, Italy, and France throughout the Middle Ages, and its popularity increased during the 19th century while still regarded as being a flower name. The name of the flower has the etymology of Old English rōse from the Latin rosa; phonetically linked to the Greek rhódon, which is independent of the etymology of the surname Rose. Distinctions can sometimes be made between individuals who derive this given name after the surname and those who are named after the flower.

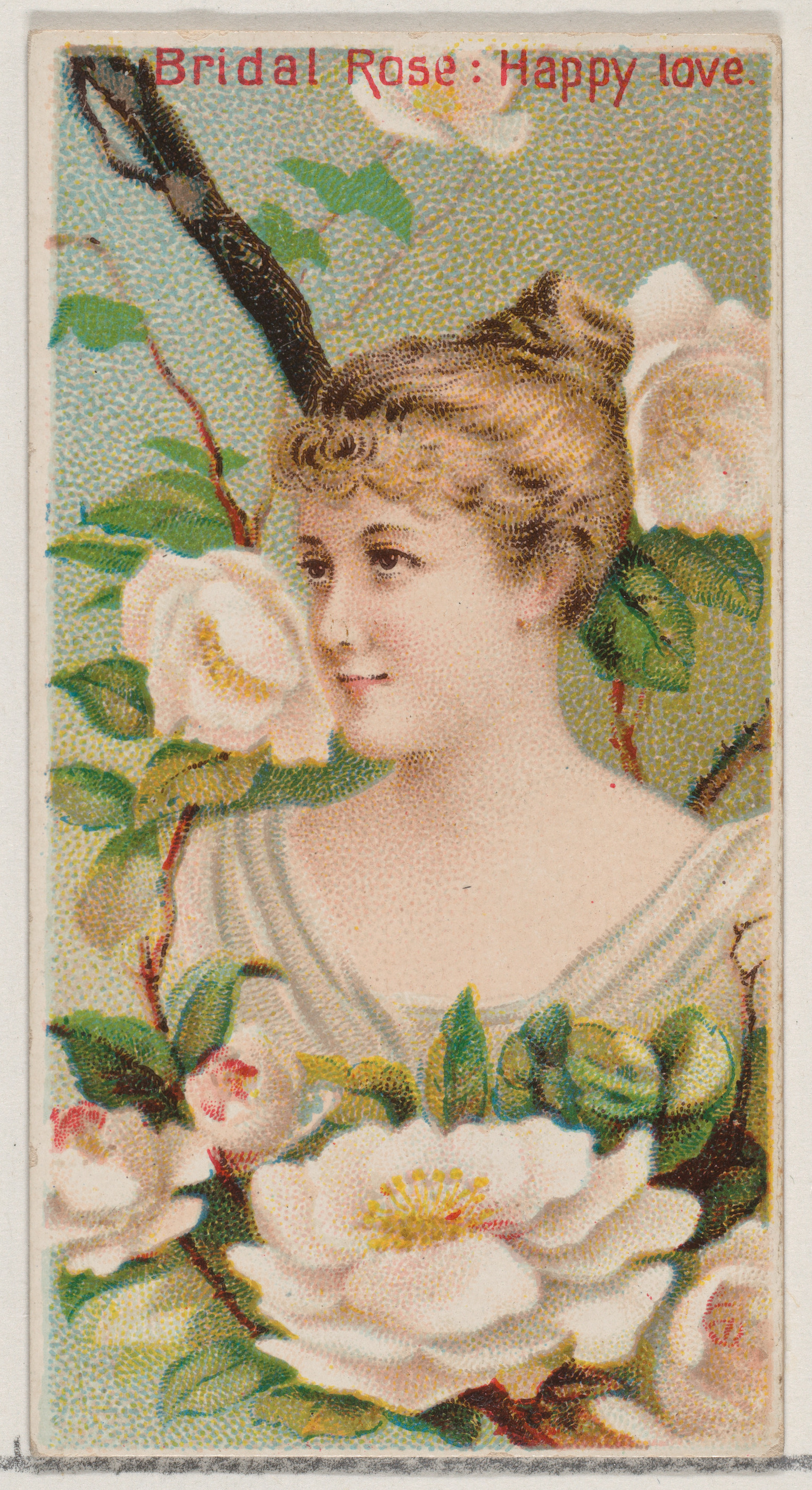
A bridal rose is said to signify happy love in the language of flowers.

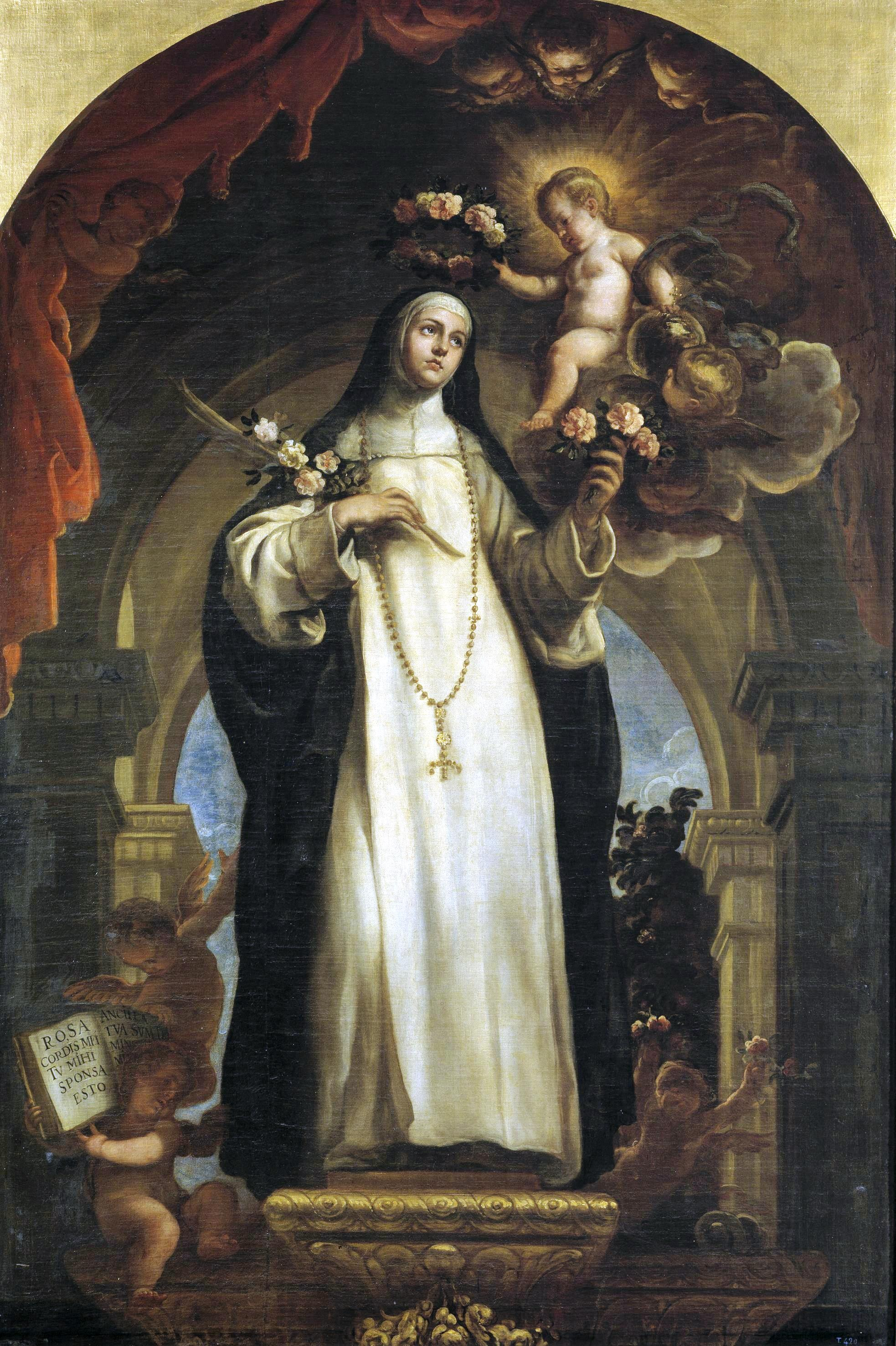
Saint Rose of Lima by Claudio Coello.

Rhoda, as in Acts 12:12-15, is the Greek equivalent. St. Rose of Lima was the first person born in the Americas to be canonized.

== Other language variants ==
- Czech: Rosalie, Rosálie, Rosarie, Růžena
- Danish: Rosalie
- Dutch: Roos, Rosa, Rosalie
- French: Rose, Rosalie
- Galician: Rosalía
- Greek: Rhodē ˁΡόδη
- Hungarian: Rozália Róza
- Indonesian: Rosa, Rose, Rosalia, Rosalina, Rosella, Rosaria, Rosy, Rosario, Rosalyn, Rosaria, Rosina
- Irish: Róisín
- Italian: Rosa, Rosalba, Rosalia, Rosalina, Rosaria, Rosaura, Rosella, Rosellina, Rosetta, Rosina
- Latvian: Roze, Roza, Rozālija, Rozīte (diminutive)
- Portuguese: Rosa, Rosália, Rosalba, Rosária, Rosy, Rose (mainly in Brazil, e.g. Rose de Freitas), Rosinha (diminutive)
- Polish: Rozalia, Róża
- Serbo-Croatian: Ruža, Ružica, Rozalija
- Slovak: Rozália, Remmie, Ružena, Rozalina
- Spanish: Rosalía, Rosa, Rosalba, Rosario
- Ukrainian: Розалія/Rozalia, Рузя/Ruzya

== People with the given name ==
- Rose of Lima (1586–1617), Peruvian saint
- Rose of Viterbo (1233–1251), Italian saint
- Rose (French singer) (born 1978), French singer-songwriter
- Rose-Alexandrine Barreau (1773–1843), French soldier
- Rose A. Walker (1879–1942), Australian painter and miniaturist
- Rose Atwell (born 2009), American chess player
- Rose Ayling-Ellis (born 1994), English actress and campaigner
- Rose Betts (born 1991), English singer-songwriter
- Rose Byrne (born 1979), Australian actress, best known for her role on the American television series Damages
- Rose-Marie Carlsson (born 1954), Swedish politician
- Rose Chen Aijie, Chinese saint
- Rose Cleveland (1846–1918), acting First Lady of the United States from 1885 to 1886
- Rose Combe (1883–1932), French writer
- Rose Mary Crawshay (1828–1907), British philanthropist and suffragist
- Rose Dieng-Kuntz (1956–2008), Senegalese French computer scientist
- Rose Emma Drummond (1790–1840), British portrait miniaturist
- Rose Philippine Duchesne (1769–1852), French-American saint
- Rose Dugdale (born 1941), English heiress who joined the Provisional Irish Republican Army
- Rose Freistater (born 1908), American schoolteacher
- Rose Gaffney (1895–1979), American environmental activist
- Lady Rose Gilman, member of the British Royal Family
- Rose Girone (1912–2025), Polish Holocaust survivor and American businesswoman
- Rose Goldblatt (1913–1997), Canadian administrator, pianist and teacher
- Rose Gray (chef) (1939–2010), English chef
- Rose Gray (born 1996), English singer-songwriter
- Rose Hamburger (1890–1996), American racetrack handicapper
- Rose Hart (born 1942), Ghanaian track and field athlete
- Rose Henderson (1871–1937), Canadian political and social activist
- Rose Hendriks (fl. 1845–1856), British novelist and poet
- Rose Hill (actress) (1914–2003), British actress
- Rose Hill (athlete) (born c. 1956), British wheelchair athlete
- Rose Hilton (1931–2019), English painter
- Rose Hobart (1906–2000), American actress
- Rose Kennedy (1890–1995), American philanthropist, socialite, and a member of the Kennedy family
- Rose Marie "Rosemary" Kennedy (1918–2005), a member of the Kennedy family
- Rose Kim (given name also spelled "Rosa" or "Nosa"), Korean saint
- Rose Laurens (1953–2018), French singer-songwriter
- Rose Leslie (born 1987), Scottish actress
- Rose Leveson-Gower (1890–1967), British aristocrat
- Rose Mabel Lewis (1853–1928), Welsh writer and suffragist
- Rose Wilder Lane (1886–1968), American journalist and political theorist, daughter of Laura Ingalls Wilder
- Rose Lok (pilot) (1912–1978), Chinese American pilot
- Rose Lokissim (1955–1986), Chadian soldier
- Rose Lounsbury, American author and politician
- Rose Marie (1923–2017), American actress
- Rose Matafeo (born 1992), New Zealand comedian, actress, and TV presenter
- Rose McClendon (1884–1936), American Broadway actress
- Rose McGowan (born 1973), American actress
- Rose McIver (born 1988), New Zealand actress
- Rose Montoya (born 1995), American model, internet celebrity, and transgender activist
- Rose Mooney-Slater (1902–1981), American physicist
- Rose Mortem, American musician and fashion designer
- Rose Mwebaza, Ugandan lawyer
- Rose Mwonya (born 1941), Kenyan academic
- Rose Nabinger (born 1958), German singer-songwriter
- Rose Nader (1906–2006), Lebanese-American activist
- Rose Napoli, Canadian playwright and actor
- Rose Njeri, Kenyan software developer
- Rose Pacatte, American film critic and Catholic nun
- Rose Pere (1937–2020), Māori New Zealand educationalist and spiritual leader
- Rose Perussi, Brazilian contemporary visual artist and writer
- Rose Porteous (born 1948), Filipino-born Australian socialite
- Rose Prokop (1897–1973), American politician
- Rose Rollins (born 1981), American actress
- Rose Sardana (born 1995), Indian actress
- Rose Schlossberg (born 1988), American artist and filmmaker
- Rose Schneiderman (1882–1972), Polish-born American labor organizer and socialist
- Rose Selfridge (1860–1918), property developer
- Rose Seretse, CEO of the Botswana Energy Regulatory Authority
- Rose Cook Small
- Rose Stern (1869–1953), first British woman member of the Royal Institute of Chemistry
- Rose Stone (born 1945), African-American singer and keyboardist for Sly & the Family Stone
- Rose Venkatesan, Indian transgender talk show host
- Rose Villain (born 1989), Italian singer-songwriter and rapper
- Rose A. Walker (1879–1942), Australian painter
- Rose Wangui, Kenyan journalist
- Rose Warfman (1916–2016), French survivor of Auschwitz and member of the French Resistance
- Rose Ella Warner (1916–2007), American zoologist
- Rose Weaver, American dramatist
- Lady Rose Weigall (1834–1921), British philanthropist and biographer
- Rose Wélépa (born 1986), New Caledonian Paralympic athlete
- Rose West (born 1953), English serial killer and sex offender
- Rose Whitty (1831–1911), Irish Dominican Sister and missionary
- Rose Williams (artist) (1915–2015), Navajo potter
- Rose Williams (actress) (born 1994), English actress
- Rose Windross, British singer-songwriter
- Rose Witcop (1890–1932), Anarchist and birth control activist
- Rose Wolfe (1916–2016), Canadian social worker
- Rose Wood (1845–1932), American actress
- Rose Mary Woods (1917–2005), Personal secretary to President Richard Nixon (1917-2005)
- Rose Wortis (1895–1958)
- Rose Wylie (born 1934), British painter
- Rose Lamartine Yates (1875–1954), English social campaigner and suffragette
- Rose Yeboah (born 2001), Ghanaian high jumper
- Rose Emmet Young (1869–1941), American writer and suffragist
- Rose Maud Young (1866–1947), Irish poet
- Rose al Yusuf (journalist) (1898–1958), Lebanese-born Egyptian actress
- Rose Zar (1922–2001), Polish Holocaust survivor and human rights activist
- Rose Zeller (1891–1975), New Zealand artist, writer and teacher
- Rose Zetzer, American lawyer
- Rose Zhang (born 2003), American professional golfer
- Rose Zhao, Chinese saint
- Rose Zimbardo (1932–2015), American academic
- Rose Zwi (1928–2018), South African-Australian writer and anti-apartheid activist

Middle name

- Amber Rose Revah (born 1968), American actress
- April Rose Wilkens (born 1970), American woman who killed her ex-fiancé
- Darcy Rose Byrnes (born 1998), American actress
- Julianna Rose Mauriello, American actress
- Kathleen Rose Perkins (born 1974), American actress
- Mabel Rose Welch (1871–1959), American painter
- Marion Rose Wiesel (1931–2025), Austrian-American Holocaust survivor, humanitarian, and translator
- Moriah Rose Pereira, American singer, songwriter, and musician known as Poppy
- Myrtle Rose White (1888–1961), Australian author
- Pernille Rose Grønkjær (born 1973), Danish director
- Ruby Rose Langenheim (born 1986), Australian model, actress, disc jockey, and television presenter
- Sadie Rose Weilerstein (1894–1993), American Jewish children's book writer
- Sune Rose Wagner (born 1973), Danish singer-songwriter and guitarist

== Fictional characters ==
- Rose (Keeping Up Appearances)
- Rose (Two and a Half Men)
- Rose (Titans character)
- Rose (Marvel Comics), a persona used by several characters in Marvel Comics
  - The Rose (comics) or Richard Fisk, a character in Marvel Comics
- Rose (Street Fighter), from the Street Fighter video game series
- Rose Granger-Weasley, daughter of Ronald Weasley and Hermione Granger in the Harry Potter books
- Rose Henderson (Rose Nadler), from the ABC TV show Lost
- Rose Nadler, fictional character on the American Broadcasting Company (ABC) television series Lost
- Rose Nylund, from the TV series The Golden Girls
- Rose Ortiz, the pink Ranger from Power Rangers Operation Overdrive
- Rose Quartz, from the animated series Steven Universe
- Rose Taylor, a character from the TV show 7th Heaven
- Rosé Thomas, in the Japanese anime and manga series Fullmetal Alchemist
- Rose Tico, from Star Wars: The Last Jedi
- Rose Tyler, a companion of the Doctor in the BBC series Doctor Who
- Rose Walker, from the Australian soap opera Neighbours
- Rose Walker, from the Sandman comics series
- Rose Wilson, daughter of Deathstroke (Slade) in the DC Comics universe

== See also ==
- Rose (disambiguation)
- Rose (surname)
- Roser (name), given name and surname
