= Ruzena =

Ruzena may refer to:

- Ruzena Bajcsy, American engineer and computer scientist
- Růžena, a Czech given name
- Růžená, a municipality in Vysočina Region, Czech Republic
- 1856 Růžena, a main-belt asteroid
