= Gaffney =

Origin
- Region of origin: Cavan, Ireland

Gaffney is a surname common to the region of Cavan in Ireland, and now spread across other English-speaking nations. Gaffney comes from the Gaelic septs of Ó Gamhna, Mac Conghamhna and Ó Caibheanaigh. Gaffney more commonly does not appear with the Gaelic prefixes of O' or Mc but there have been Gaffneys recorded with either of the Gaelic prefixes.

In Hebrew context the surname Gaffney (Hebrew: גפני, alternative English spellings: Gafni/Gafny) is used for Jewish people whose ancestors were wine makers as "Geffen" (גפן) is the Hebrew word for vitis.

Notable people with the surname include:

- Beryl Gaffney (born 1930), Canadian politician
- Christopher Gaffney (bishop) (died 1576), Irish bishop
- Chris Gaffney (musician) (1950–2008), American singer–songwriter
- Christopher Gaffney (archaeologist) (born 1962), British archaeologist
- David Gaffney (born 1961), British writer
- Dean Gaffney (born 1978), British actor
- Derrick Gaffney (1955–2025), American football player
- Edward Gaffney (born 1943), American politician
- Elizabeth Gaffney (born 1966), American novelist
- Ellie Gaffney (1932–2007), Torres Strait Islander-Indonesian nurse, writer and Indigenous rights activist
- Eric Gaffney (born 1967), American songwriter
- Eugene S. Gaffney, American paleontologist
- F. Drew Gaffney (born 1946), American doctor
- Frank Gaffney (born 1953), American lobbyist
- Frank Gaffney (Medal of Honor) (1883–1948), American soldier
- Jabar Gaffney (born 1980), American football player
- James Anthony Gaffney, British civil engineer
- James E. Gaffney (1868–1932), American baseball executive
- Jim Gaffney (1921–2015), American football player
- John Gaffney (baseball) (1855–1913), American baseball umpire and manager
- Kiley Gaffney, Australian musician
- Mason Gaffney, (1923–2020), American economist
- Matt Gaffney, (born 1972), American crossword puzzle constructor
- Mo Gaffney (born 1958), American actress
- Patricia Gaffney (born 1944), American writer
- Robert J. Gaffney (born 1944), American politician
- Robbie Gaffney (born 1957), Irish football player
- Rose Gaffney (1895–1979), American environmental activist
- Tony Gaffney (born 1984), American basketball player

== See also ==
- Gaffaney, surname
- Gaffney, South Carolina, a city in the United States
- Kelly Gaffney, fictional character in Law & Order: Trial by Jury
- Roger Gaffney, fictional character in Homicide: Life on the Street
- Tom Gaffney, fictional character in Scarface (1932)
