= Caritina Piña =

Mexican politician and anarchist (1895–1981)

- Born: 1895; Ocampo Municipality
- Died: 1981 (aged 85–86)
- Occupation: Anarchist, activist, women's rights activist

Caritina Piña (1895 in Ocampo - 1981) was a Mexican anarcho-syndicalist-anarcha-feminist activist and Sexologist. A notable anarchist from the Gulf of Mexico region, she was associated with Librado Rivera. She is credited as one of the first modern feminists in Mexican history.

== Biography ==
Caritina Piña Montalvo was born in 1895 in Ocampo, Tamaulipas. Her father was a general in the Mexican army and served under the regime of Porfirio Díaz. From the late 1910s, she advocated for the freedom of political prisoners and embraced anarcho-syndicalism.

Piña was one of Mexico's first feminists and actively involved in both the anarchist and feminist movements in Mexico. Her personal journey allowed her to build connections across various groups, cultures, and social classes. During the 1920s and 1930s, she took on a leadership role within her movement and was connected with other notable figures of the Mexican anarchist movement, such as Librado Rivera.

Her legacy, which quickly faded into obscurity after her death, was rediscovered in the 21st century, notably thanks to the work of historian Sonia Hernandez.
