= 6th federal electoral district of Tamaulipas =

Federal electoral district of Mexico

Tamaulipas's 6th
- Electoral district of the Chamber of Deputies of Mexico

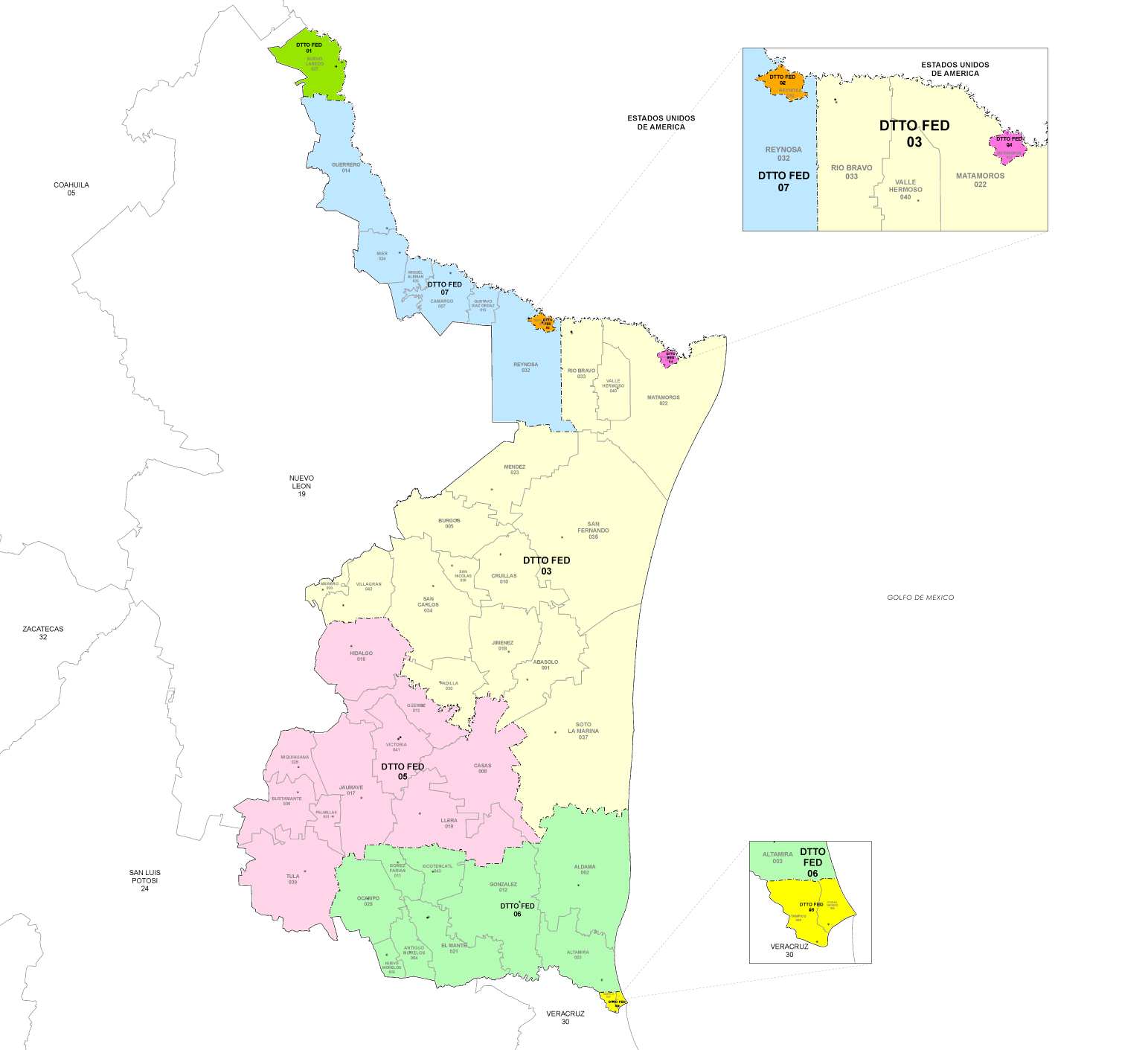
- 6th district since 2023

Incumbent
- Member: Blanca Narro Panameño
- Party: ▌Morena
- Congress: 66th (2024–2027)

District
- State: Tamaulipas
- Head town: Ciudad Mante
- Coordinates: 22°44′N 98°57′W
- Covers: 9 municipalities: Aldama, Altamira, Antiguo Morelos, Gómez Farías, González, El Mante, Nuevo Morelos, Ocampo, Xicoténcatl
- PR region: Second
- Precincts: 281
- Population: 502,617 (2020 census)

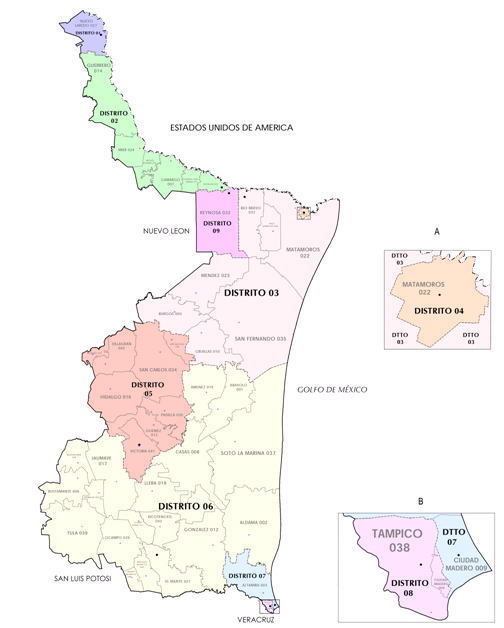
Tamaulipas's districts in 2017–2022

The 6th federal electoral district of Tamaulipas (Spanish: Distrito electoral federal 06 de Tamaulipas) is one of the 300 electoral districts into which Mexico is divided for elections to the federal Chamber of Deputies and one of eight such districts in the state of Tamaulipas.

It elects one deputy to the lower house of Congress for each three-year legislative session by means of the first-past-the-post system. Votes cast in the district also count towards the calculation of proportional representation ("plurinominal") deputies elected from the second region.

The current member for the district, elected in the 2024 general election, is Blanca Araceli Narro Panameño of the National Regeneration Movement (Morena).

== District territory ==
Tamaulipas lost a district in the 2023 districting plan adopted by the National Electoral Institute (INE), which is to be used for the 2024, 2027 and 2030 federal elections. The reconfigured 6th district covers the south of the state and comprises 281 electoral precincts (secciones electorales) across nine of the state's 43 municipalities:

- Aldama, Altamira, Antiguo Morelos, Gómez Farías, González, El Mante, Nuevo Morelos, Ocampo and Xicoténcatl.

The head town (cabecera distrital), where results from individual polling stations are gathered together and tallied, is the city of Ciudad Mante. The district reported a population of 502,617 in the 2020 census.

== Previous districting schemes ==
Evolution of electoral district numbers
	1974	1978	1996	2005	2017	2023
Tamaulipas	6	9	8	8	9	8
Chamber of Deputies	196	300				

2017–2022

Between 2017 and 2022, Tamaulipas accounted for nine single-member congressional seats. The 6th district's head town was at Ciudad Mante and it covered 18 municipalities:
- Abasolo, Aldama, Antiguo Morelos, Bustamante, Casas, Gómez Farias, González, Jaumave, Jiménez, Llera, El Mante, Miquihuana, Nuevo Morelos, Ocampo, Palmillas, Soto la Marina, Tula and Xicoténcatl.

2005–2017

Under the 2005 plan, Tamaulipas had eight districts. This district's head town was at Ciudad Mante and it covered 17 municipalities:
- Abasolo, Antiguo Morelos, Bustamante, Casas, Gómez Farias, González, Jaumave, Jiménez, Llera, El Mante, Miquihuana, Nuevo Morelos, Ocampo, Palmillas, Soto la Marina, Tula and Xicoténcatl.

1996–2005

In the 1996 scheme, under which Tamaulipas lost a single-member seat, the district had its head town at Ciudad Mante and it comprised nine municipalities:
- Antiguo Morelos, Gómez Farías, González, Llera, El Mante, Nuevo Morelos, Ocampo, Tula and Xicoténcatl.

1978–1996

The districting scheme in force from 1978 to 1996 was the result of the 1977 electoral reforms, which increased the number of single-member seats in the Chamber of Deputies from 196 to 300. Under that plan, Tamaulipas's seat allocation rose from six to nine. The 6th district's head town was at Ciudad Madero and it covered the municipalities of Altamira, Ciudad Madero and González.

== Deputies returned to Congress ==
(Mexico) National parties
- Current
- PAN
- PRI
- PT
- PVEM
- MC
- Morena
- PAZ
- Somos
- Defunct or local only
- PLM
- PNR
- PRM
- PNM
- PP
- PPS
- PARM
- PFCRN
- CON
- PANAL
- PSD
- PES
- PES
- PRD

Tamaulipas's 6th district
Election	Deputy	Party	Term	Legislature
1976	Julio Dolores Martínez Rodríguez	Institutional Revolutionary Party	1976–1979	50th Congress
1979	Hugo Eduardo Barba Islas	Institutional Revolutionary Party	1979–1982	51st Congress
1982	Benito Ignacio Santamaría Sánchez	Institutional Revolutionary Party	1982–1985	52nd Congress
1985	Luis Nájera Olvera	Institutional Revolutionary Party	1985–1988	53rd Congress
1988	Julián Murillo Navarro	Institutional Revolutionary Party	1988–1991	54th Congress
1991	Jesús Suárez Mata	Institutional Revolutionary Party	1991–1994	55th Congress
1994	Jesús Olvera Méndez	Institutional Revolutionary Party	1994–1997	56th Congress
1997	José Ernesto Manrique Villarreal	Institutional Revolutionary Party	1997–2000	57th Congress
2000	Enrique Meléndez Pérez	Institutional Revolutionary Party	2000–2003	58th Congress
2003	Óscar Martín Ramos Salinas (Note: Originally elected for the PRI, Ramos Salinas declared himself independent on 16 March 2006.)	Institutional Revolutionary Party Independent politician	2003–2006	59th Congress
2006	Enrique Cárdenas del Avellano	Institutional Revolutionary Party	2006–2009	60th Congress
2009	Luis Alejandro Guevara Cobos	Institutional Revolutionary Party	2009–2012	61st Congress
2012	Rosalba de la Cruz Requena	Institutional Revolutionary Party	2012–2015	62nd Congress
2015	Luis Alejandro Guevara Cobos	Institutional Revolutionary Party	2015–2018	63rd Congress
2018	Vicente Javier Verástegui Ostos (Note: Verástegui Ostos resigned his seat on 23 March 2021 was replaced for the remainder of his term by his alternate, Martínez Carrizales.); Eloy Martínez Carrizales	National Action Party (Mexico)	2018–2021; 2021	64th Congress
2021	Marco Antonio Castro Narváez	National Action Party (Mexico)	2021–2024	65th Congress
2024	Blanca Araceli Narro Panameño	National Regeneration Movement	2024–2027	66th Congress

== Presidential elections ==
Tamaulipas's 6th district
Election	District won by	Party or coalition	%
2018	Ricardo Anaya Cortés	Por México al Frente	38.2794
2024	Claudia Sheinbaum Pardo	Sigamos Haciendo Historia	64.3635
