= Rosalia =

Rosalia or Rosalía (with diacritic) may refer to:

== Persons ==
- Rosalia (given name)
  - Saint Rosalia (1130–1166), the patron saint of Palermo in Italy
  - Rosalía (born 1992), Spanish singer

== Places ==
- 314 Rosalia, an asteroid
- Rosalia, Pisidia, an ancient city and former bishopric in Pisidia, now in Asian Turkey and a Latin Catholic titular see
- Rosalia, Kansas, U.S.
- Rosalia, Washington, U.S.

== Other uses ==
- Rosalia (beetle), a genus of beetles
- Rosalia (festival), a flower festival in the Roman Empire
- Sequential modulation or rosalia
- Rosalía (TV series), a 1978 Mexican telenovela
- Rosalia, a virus in the video game Trauma Team

== See also ==
- Santa Rosalía (disambiguation)
- Rosalie (disambiguation)
- "Rosealia", a song by Better Than Ezra
- Roselia (disambiguation)
