= Rozelle (disambiguation) =

Rozelle is a suburb of Sydney, Australia. It can also refer to:

- Rozelle Bay of Sydney Harbour, Australia
- Rozelle Interchange, Sydney, Australia
- Rozelle (given name)
- Rozelle (surname)

== See also ==
- Roselle (disambiguation)
- Rozella (disambiguation)
