= Rosalie (given name) =

Rosalie (/ˈroʊzəli/ ROH-zə-lee, /ˈrɒzə-/ ROZ-ə-) is a feminine given name, the French, German, and Dutch form of the Roman name Rosalia, which was ultimately derived from the Latin word rosa, meaning rose. The name may also be spelled Rozalie in Dutch and Rosalee or Rosaleigh in English. Diminutives for the name include Rosa, Rose, Roz, or Rosie. The name Rosalie means little rose or rose garden

Notable people with the name include:

- Rosalie Abella (born 1946), Canadian jurist
- Rosalie Abrams (1921–2010), American playwright
- Rosalie Adams, British governor
- Rosalie Allen (1924–2003), American country singer, songwriter, guitarist, columnist and television and radio host
- Rosalie Bertell (1929–2012), American scientist
- Rosalie Birch (born 1983), English cricketer
- Rosalie Bradford (1942–2006), American woman
- Rosalie Chiang (born 2005), American actress
- Rosalie de Constant (1758–1834), Swiss naturalist
- Rosalie Craig (born 1981), English actress
- Rosalie Crutchley (1920–1997), British actress
- Rosalie Cunningham (born 1990), English singer-songwriter
- Rosalie Deighton (born 1976), Dutch singer
- Rosalie Dreyer (1895–1987), Swiss nurse
- Rosalie Duthé (1748–1830), French courtesan
- Rosalie Edge (1877–1962), American socialite, suffragist, and amateur birdwatcher
- Rosalie Emslie (1891–1977), British artist
- Rosalie Filleul (1752–1794), French artist
- Rosalie Fougelberg (1841–1911), Swedish dentist
- Rosalie B. Green (1917–2012), American art historian
- Rosalie Konou, Assistant Attorney General of the Marshall Islands
- Rosalie Anderson MacDowell, American actress
- Lokalia Montgomery (1903–1978), born Rosalie Lokalia Lovelle, American Hawaiian cultural historian and artist
- Rosalie Nawira (born 1968), Central African politician
- Rosalie Pouzère (born 1944), Central African politician
- Rosalie A. Reed (born 1945), American veterinarian
- Rosalie Rendu (1786–1856), venerated by the Roman Catholic Church
- Rosalie Roos, Swedish feminist
- Rosalie Salvame, Filipino politician
- Rosalie Selfridge, known as Rose Selfridge (1860–1918), property developer
- Rosalie Sjöman, Swedish photographer
- Rosalie Sorrels (1933–2017), American folk singer-songwriter
- Rosalie Sully (1818–1847), American painter
- Rosalie Tennison (1958–2025), Canadian writer and journalist
- Rosalie Thomass (born 1987), German actress
- Rosalie Tremblay (born 2008), Canadian ice hockey player
- Rosalie Trombley, American music executive
- Rosalie Varda (born 1958), French costume designer
- Rosalie E. Wahl (1924–2013), American lawyer
- Rosalie Wilkins (born 1946), British politician
- Rosalie Williams, British actress
- Rosalie Woodruff, Australian politician

== In fiction ==
- Rosalie Lamorlière, in The Rose of Versailles
- Rosalie Hale, vampire in Stephenie Meyer's Twilight series
- Rosalie Murray/Rosalie Ashby, in Anne Bronte's Agnes Grey
- Rosalie Otterbourne, in Agatha Christie's Death on the Nile
- Rosalie Aprile, in The Sopranos

== See also ==
- Rosalie (disambiguation)
- Rose (given name)
- Rosie (given name)
