= Rozella (disambiguation) =

Rozella is a genus of fungi.

Rozella may also refer to:

- Rozella, Central Province, a village in Sri Lanka
- Rozella Lake, pen name of Roberta Leigh, British author
- Rozella M. Schlotfeldt (1914–2005), American nurse, educator, and researcher
- Rozella B. Smith (1911–1987). American herpetologist and data archivist and analyst

== See also ==
- Rosella (disambiguation)
- Rossella (disambiguation)
- Rozelle (disambiguation)
