= Rose Williams =

Rose Williams may refer to:

- Rose Williams (artist) (c. 1915–2015), Navajo potter
- Rose Williams (actress) (born 1994), English actress
- Rose Isabel Williams (1909–1996), sister and muse of American playwright and screenwriter Tennessee Williams
- W. E. D. Ross (1912–1995), Canadian actor, playwright and writer, who sometimes wrote under the pseudonym Rose Williams
