= Rossella (given name) =

Rossella is a female given name. Notable people with the name include:

- Rossella Biscotti, Italian visual artist
- Rossella Brescia, Italian television presenter
- Rossella Callovi, Italian road and track racing cyclist
- Rossella Como, Italian actress and television personality
- Rossella Falk, Italian actress
- Rossella Fiamingo, Italian épée fencer
- Rossella Giordano, Italian race walker
- Rossella Gregorio, Italian sabre fencer
- Rossella Jardini, Italian fashion designer
- Rossella Olivotto, Italian female volleyball player
- Rossella Ratto, Italian racing cyclist
- Rossella Tarolo, Italian sprinter

== See also ==
- Rossella (disambiguation)
- Rosella (disambiguation)
