= Tehuacán (disambiguation) =

Tehuacán may refer to:

== Places ==
In Mexico

- Tehuacán Municipality, Puebla
- Tehuacán, Puebla
- Tehuacán Airport, Puebla
- Tehuacán Valley
- Tehuacán, Ocampo in Ocampo Municipality, Tamaulipas

Tehuacan:

- Tehuacan, Ocosingo
- Tehuacan, Tonalá
- Tehuacan, Tumbalá
- Tehuacan, Villaflores

In El Salvador

- Tehuacán (sitio arqueológico)
