= Rosalba =

- “Roses” by Vincent van Gogh. The name Rosalba means “white rose.”
- Gender: Feminine

Origin
- Origin: Latin
- Meaning: White rose

Rosalba is a feminine personal name, derived from the Latin rosa alba, the white rose. Although known in English, the name is especially associated with Italy, and is also common in Spanish and Portuguese-speaking countries, where it is also a surname. It may refer to any of the following individuals:

== People ==
- Rosalba Bernini (ca. 1762-1829), Italian pastellist
- Rosalba Carriera (1673–1757), Venetian painter and portraitist of the Rococo style
- Rosalba Casas (born 1950), professor of history and socio-politics at Montreal University
- Rosalba Gualito Castañeda (born 1966), Mexican politician
- Rosalba Cimino (born 1990), Italian politician
- Rosalba Rincon Castell (1934–2014), Colombian fencing instructor
- Rosalba Ciarlini (born 1952), Brazilian politician
- Rosaria Console (born 1979), Italian long-distance runner, better known as "Rosalba."
- Rosalba De Giorgi (born 1970), Italian politician and journalist
- Rosalba Dominguez, American politician
- Rosalba Forciniti (b. 1986), member of the 2012 Italian Olympic Judo team
- Rosalba Morales (born 1998), Colombian weightlifter
- Rosalba Neri (born 1939), Italian actress also known by the name "Sara Bey" or "Bay"
- Rosalba Patiño (born 1960), Colombian chess player
- Rosalba Pedrina (born 1944), Italian artist
- Rosalba Perna, Italian and American astrophysicist
- Rosalba Pippa (born 1982), Italian singer and actress, also known by her stage name, Arisa
- Rosalba De la Cruz Requena (born 1954), Mexican politician
- Rosalba Rolón (born 1951), Puerto Rican actress and director
- Rosalba Todaro (1941-2022), Chilean economist and scholar of women's economic issues

== Surname ==
- Simone Rosalba (b. 1976), a member of the 2000 Italian Olympic volleyball team.

== Fictional characters ==
- Rosalba, a character in The Rose and the Ring, a novel by William Makepeace Thackeray.
- Rosalba, a character in The Rose Rent, a mystery novel by Ellis Peters, dramatized in an episode of the TV series Cadfael.
- Ellena Rosalba, main character in The Italian, a 1797 novel by Ann Radcliffe.

== See also ==
- Rosalba (beetle), a genus of longhorn beetles
- Rosalba, la fanciulla di Pompei, a 1952 Italian film
