= Alice Cling =

American ceramist and potter

Alice Williams Cling
- Born: Alice Williams; March 21, 1946 (age 80); Cow Springs, Arizona U.S.
- Other names: Alice Williams Cling
- Education: Intermountain Indian School
- Occupations: Navajo potter Ceramicist
- Years active: 1976-present

Alice Williams Cling (Navajo, born March 21, 1946) is a Native American ceramist and potter known for creating beautiful and innovative pottery that has a distinctive rich reds, purples, browns and blacks that have a polished and shiny exteriors, revolutionizing the functional to works of art. Critics have argued that she is the most important Navajo potter of the last 25 years.

== Early life ==
Cling was born in Cow Springs, Arizona, in the Tonalea area of the Navajo Nation.

In 1966, Cling graduated from the Intermountain Indian School in Brigham City, Utah.

== Career ==
Cling learned the craft of pottery from her mother, Rose Williams, and her great-aunt, Grace Barlow. The pots are created from clay found near the Black Mesa area in Apache-Navajo Counties in Arizona, and are then fired outdoors using juniper wood, with the firing process enhancing the clay's natural pigments. Cling and her mother and aunt were responsible for revitalizing traditional Navajo pottery.

Cling is a coil potter, and was the first Navajo potter to use a smooth river stone to polish her pots instead of the traditional corncob. Her pottery is considered non-utilitarian, which represented a huge shift from function to art.

In 1978, Cling's work was selected by Joan Mondale and featured in the vice-presidential mansion in Washington, D.C. and she was honored with the Arizona Indian Living Treasures Award in 2006. Cling's work is in the collection of the Smithsonian.

== Personal life ==
Cling learned her pottery skills from her mother, master potter Rose Williams. She lived across the highway from her mother in Shonto, Arizona. Following in the family tradition, Cling's daughters are also artists, as are her sisters, Sue Ann Williams, and Susie Williams Crank.

Cling married Jervis "Jerry" Cling shortly after graduating from high school. They had four children. She works and lives in the Shonto-Cow Springs area in Arizona.

== Collections ==
- Amerind Foundation, Dragoon, AZ
- Arizona State Museum, Tempe, AZ
- Heard Museum, Phoenix, AZ
- Millicent Rogers Museum, Taos, NM
- Phoenix Art Museum, Phoenix, AZ
- Spencer Museum of Art, Lawrence, KS

== Awards ==
- 2006: Arizona Indian Living Treasures Award

== Selected works ==
- Wedding Vase with Braided Handles at the Smithsonian American Art Museum, 1987
- Pot with Incised Geometric Decoration at the Smithsonian American Art Museum, 1988
