= Rosalie =

Rosalie may refer to:

== People ==
- Rosalie (given name)
- Rosalie Levasseur (1749–1826), French soprano billed as Mademoiselle Rosalie
- Rosalie Rendu or Sr. Rosalie (1786–1856), venerated by the Roman Catholic Church

== Film and theater ==
- Rosalie (musical), a 1928 musical by the Gershwins and others
  - Rosalie (1937 film), a film version of the musical
- Rosalie, an award-winning 1966 short film by Polish director Walerian Borowczyk
- Rosalie (2023 film), a Franco-Belgian historical drama film

== Songs ==
- "Rosalie", a song by Cole Porter from the 1937 film
- "Rosalie", a song by Bob Seger from Back in '72 about Rosalie Trombley, also covered by Thin Lizzy
- "Rosalie", a 1978 song by Carlos
- "Rosalie" (song), a 2008 song by Swiss Rapper Bligg from 0816
- "Rosalie", a 2012 song by Concrete Blonde

== Places ==
- Rosalie, a locality of Paddington, Queensland, Australia
- Rosalie, Dominica, a town
- Rosalie, Nebraska, United States, a village
- Rosalie, Alabama, United States, a small community

== Other uses ==
- Tropical Storm Rosalie (disambiguation)
- Rosalie Mansion, a National Historic Landmark in Natchez, Mississippi, USA
- Citroën Rosalie, a light-weight racing car manufactured in the 1930s

== See also ==
- Rosalia (disambiguation)
- Rosella (disambiguation)
- Plague Chapel of St. Rosalie, a one-nave chapel in Košice, eastern Slovakia
- Rosaline (disambiguation)
