= Cow Springs =

Cow Springs may refer to:

- Cow Springs, Arizona, United States, an unincorporated community
- Cow Springs Member, a member of the Entrada Formation in Arizona, United States
- Cow Springs Ranch, a ranch in Luna County, New Mexico, United States
- Cow Springs, an area near Neenach, California, United States
