= Luis Guevara =

Luis Guevara may refer to:

- Luis Guevara Mora (born 1961), Salvadoran football goalkeeper
- Luis Alejandro Guevara (born 1975), Mexican politician
