= Rosalba strandi =

Scientific classification
- Kingdom: Animalia
- Phylum: Arthropoda
- Class: Insecta
- Order: Coleoptera
- Suborder: Polyphaga
- Infraorder: Cucujiformia
- Family: Cerambycidae
- Genus: Rosalba
- Species: R. strandi

Binomial name
- Rosalba strandi (Breuning, 1943)

Species of beetle

Rosalba strandi is a species of beetle in the family Cerambycidae. It was described by Breuning in 1943. It is known from Brazil.
