= Esther Glen =

NZ novelist, journalist, community worker (1881–1940)

Alice Esther Glen (26 December 1881 – 9 February 1940), known as Esther, was a New Zealand novelist, journalist and community worker. She was born in Christchurch, New Zealand, where she also died. She was the first notable New Zealand author of children's books.

== Life ==
Esther Glen grew up as the third – according to other sources, as the second – of twelve children of Robert Parker Glen and Alice Helen White in Linwood. At the age of eleven she won a writing competition, sending in a story to the magazine Little Folks.

After she had finished school, Esther Glen went to Australia in order to help her sister Helen run a kindergarten. It was there that she first encountered Australian children's books, most of all Seven Little Australians by Ethel Turner which was quite successful at the time and which had been first published in 1894. Up to then, there were no children's books by New Zealand authors. Esther Glen wrote Six little New Zealanders, first published in 1917, creating a story that drew on the experience of children growing up in New Zealand. The story is about three bachelors who are not used to children, running a sheep station in Canterbury. Their six nephews and nieces from Auckland pay them a visit during summer. As they are not used to life in the countryside, this leads to some comical complications. Until 1983 the book has been published in six editions. Critics praised Glen's light-hearted style and the realistic characters. In 1926, the sequel Uncles three at Kamahi was published.

Since 1922 Esther Glen edited the children's page in the paper Christchurch Sun, first as a freelance writer. From 1925 she was hired as an editor and a reporter, also assisting with the women's page. At this time she was given the nickname Lady Gay. She called on children to send in their own stories, poems, and pictures. From 1935 she worked for the Christchurch Press. She also wrote some of the earliest radio dramas for children.

Esther Glen also was socially committed and a philanthropist. She founded clubs where children could meet and make friends, so as to overcome their isolation in the New Zealand countryside. During the Great Depression children knitted, sewed, and cooked there for the poor. Glen also contributed to the Christchurch Women's Unemployment Committee, speaking out in favour of single women given adequate accommodation. She supported setting up a children's home there.

Glen did not marry and she had no children. She died on 9 February 1940 in Christchurch after a short illness.

== Esther Glen Award ==
The Esther Glen Award was created in her memory. The literary prize has been awarded yearly (with some exceptions) since 1945 by the Library and Information Association of New Zealand Aotearoa (LIANZA) to a New Zealand author "for the most distinguished contribution to New Zealand literature for junior fiction". It is the longest-running and the most notable New Zealand literary prize for children's books.

== Publications ==
- Six Little New Zealanders (1917)
- Twinkles on the Mountain (1920; illustrated by Daisy Osborn)
- Uncles Three at Kamahi (1926)
- Robin of Maoriland (1929)
