= Rosalba hovorei =

Scientific classification
- Domain: Eukaryota
- Kingdom: Animalia
- Phylum: Arthropoda
- Class: Insecta
- Order: Coleoptera
- Suborder: Polyphaga
- Infraorder: Cucujiformia
- Family: Cerambycidae
- Genus: Rosalba
- Species: R. hovorei

Binomial name
- Rosalba hovorei Touroult, 2007

Species of beetle

Rosalba hovorei is a species of beetle in the family Cerambycidae. It was described by Touroult in 2007. It is known from Martinique.
