= Rosalba obliqua =

Scientific classification
- Domain: Eukaryota
- Kingdom: Animalia
- Phylum: Arthropoda
- Class: Insecta
- Order: Coleoptera
- Suborder: Polyphaga
- Infraorder: Cucujiformia
- Family: Cerambycidae
- Genus: Rosalba
- Species: R. obliqua

Binomial name
- Rosalba obliqua (Thomson, 1868)

Species of beetle

Rosalba obliqua is a species of beetle in the family Cerambycidae. It was described by Thomson in 1868. It is known from Costa Rica and Venezuela.
