= Rosalba crassepunctata =

Scientific classification
- Kingdom: Animalia
- Phylum: Arthropoda
- Class: Insecta
- Order: Coleoptera
- Suborder: Polyphaga
- Infraorder: Cucujiformia
- Family: Cerambycidae
- Genus: Rosalba
- Species: R. crassepunctata

Binomial name
- Rosalba crassepunctata Breuning, 1948

Species of beetle

Rosalba crassepunctata is a species of beetle in the family Cerambycidae. It was described by Breuning in 1948. It is known from Brazil.
