= Rosalba inscripta =

Scientific classification
- Kingdom: Animalia
- Phylum: Arthropoda
- Clade: Pancrustacea
- Class: Insecta
- Order: Coleoptera
- Suborder: Polyphaga
- Infraorder: Cucujiformia
- Family: Cerambycidae
- Genus: Rosalba
- Species: R. inscripta

Binomial name
- Rosalba inscripta (Bates, 1866)

Species of beetle

Rosalba inscripta is a species of beetle in the family Cerambycidae. It was described by Bates in 1866. It is found in Venezuela, French Guiana, Brazil (Acre, Amazonas, Pará, Rondônia, Minas Gerais, Espírito Santo, Rio de Janeiro, São Paulo, Paraná, Santa Catarina, Rio Grande do Sul), Peru, Bolivia (Santa Cruz) and Paraguay.
