= Rosalba bucki =

Scientific classification
- Kingdom: Animalia
- Phylum: Arthropoda
- Class: Insecta
- Order: Coleoptera
- Suborder: Polyphaga
- Infraorder: Cucujiformia
- Family: Cerambycidae
- Genus: Rosalba
- Species: R. bucki

Binomial name
- Rosalba bucki (Melzer, 1934)

Species of beetle

Rosalba bucki is a species of beetle in the family Cerambycidae. It was described by Melzer in 1934. It is known from Brazil.
