= Růžena =

Růžena is a Czech feminine given name, meaning Rose. Notable people with the given name include:

- Ruzena Bajcsy (born 1933), American engineer and computer scientist
- Ruzena Herlinger (1890–1978), Czech-Canadian soprano, voice teacher
- Růžena Jesenská (1863–1940), Czech teacher, poet and writer
- Růžena Košťálová (1924–2024), Czechoslovak sprint canoeist
- Růžena Maturová (1869–1938), Czech operatic soprano
- Růžena Novotná (born 1941), Czechoslovak slalom canoeist
- Růžena Svobodová (1868–1920), Czech writer
- Růžena Nasková (1884–1960), Czech actress
- Růžena Vacková (1901–1982), Czech historian and theoretician
- Růžena Šlemrová (1886–1962), Czech actress

== See also ==
- 1856 Růžena, an asteroid
- Růžená, a municipality in the Vysočina Region, Czech Republic
