= Gaffaney =

Gaffaney is a surname. Notable people with the surname include:

- Chris Gaffaney (born 1975), New Zealand cricketer
- Nick Gaffaney (born 1978), New Zealand musician

== See also ==
- Gaffney, surname
