= Rosalba suiaba =

Scientific classification
- Domain: Eukaryota
- Kingdom: Animalia
- Phylum: Arthropoda
- Class: Insecta
- Order: Coleoptera
- Suborder: Polyphaga
- Infraorder: Cucujiformia
- Family: Cerambycidae
- Genus: Rosalba
- Species: R. suiaba

Binomial name
- Rosalba suiaba Martins & Galileo, 2009

Species of beetle

Rosalba suiaba is a species of beetle in the family Cerambycidae. It was described by Martins and Galileo in 2009.
