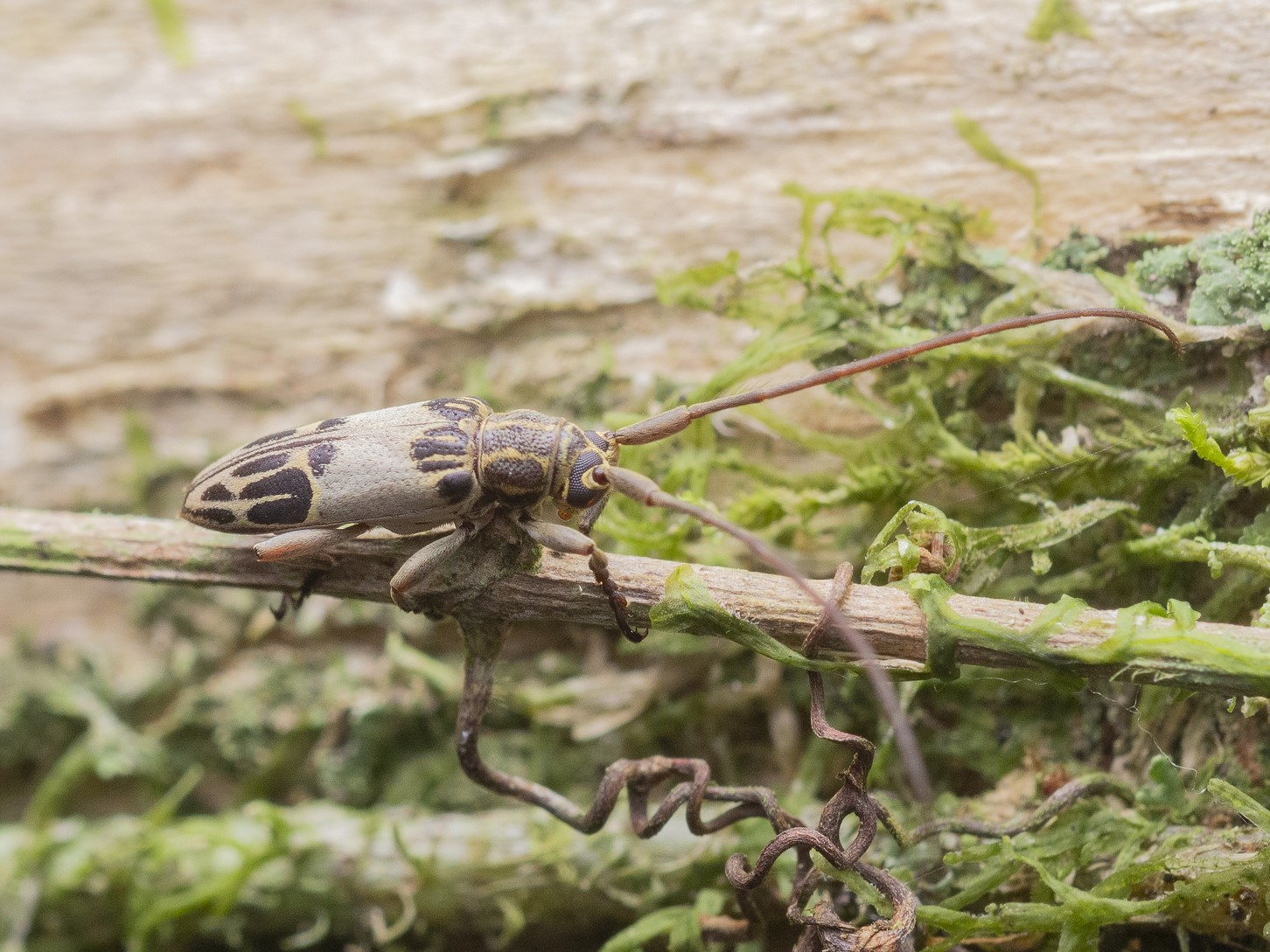

Scientific classification
- Kingdom: Animalia
- Phylum: Arthropoda
- Clade: Pancrustacea
- Class: Insecta
- Order: Coleoptera
- Suborder: Polyphaga
- Infraorder: Cucujiformia
- Family: Cerambycidae
- Genus: Rosalba
- Species: R. digna

Binomial name
- Rosalba digna (Melzer, 1934)

= Rosalba digna =

Species of beetle

Rosalba digna is a species of beetle in the family Cerambycidae. It was first described in 1934 by Julius Melzer. It is known from Brazil and Paraguay.
