= Daisy Osborn =

New Zealand artist (1888–1957)

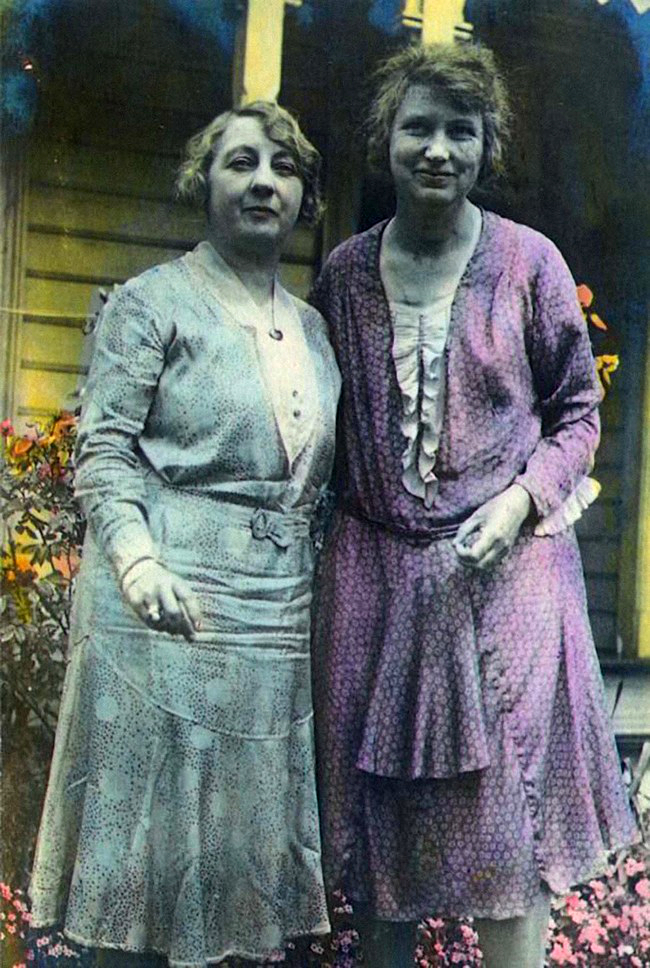
- Rose Zeller and Daisy Osborn, c. 1940. Photo hand-coloured by Daisy Osborn
- Born: 27 April 1888; Christchurch, New Zealand
- Died: 3 April 1957 (aged 68); Christchurch
- Occupations: Painter, illustrator and jewellery designer

Daisy Frances Christina Osborn (27 April 1888 – 3 May 1957) was a New Zealand painter, illustrator and jewellery designer.

== Family and education ==
Daisy Frances Christina Osborn was born in Christchurch, New Zealand, the only child of Emily Jane Turvey, an Englishwoman, and Alfred Patterson Osborn, an Australian engraver. She attended Christchurch Girls' High School and studied art at Canterbury College School of Art intermittently over fifteen years (1906–11, 1913, 1919–21). She won a scholarship and numerous prizes at the school and began to exhibit in 1913.

Osborn went on to teach part-time at the Canterbury College School of Art (1921–27), giving instruction in painting, metalwork, design, and embroidery.

== Art career ==
Osborn worked as an illustrator of children's literature, mainly in pen and watercolour, and she designed modernist jewelry in silver with enamel or cloisonné decoration. However, she is now best known as a painter of portraits, Christchurch cityscapes, still lifes, and floral studies. There is also a group of religious paintings with pacifist themes from the 1930s, influenced in part by her interest in Theosophy. The sentimentality of her illustration work stands in stark contrast to the crisp contours and bold coloring of her mature paintings, such her 1936 portrait of fellow artist Rose Zeller.

She continued to paint and exhibit until the year before she died, showing regularly at the New Zealand Academy of Fine Arts and in the 1940 National Centennial Exhibition of New Zealand Art in Wellington. Her work is in many private collections, and some of her work is held by the Christchurch Art Gallery. She was included in the 1993 exhibition White Camellias: A Century of Art Making by Canterbury Women.

== Books illustrated ==
- Glen, Esther (1920). Twinkles on the Mountain. Illustrated by Daisy Osborn. Christchurch: L. M. Isitt.
- Howes, Edith (1923). The Dream-Girl's Garden. Illustrated by Daisy Osborn. London: Ward, Lock & Co.
