= Rosalba apiculata =

Scientific classification
- Domain: Eukaryota
- Kingdom: Animalia
- Phylum: Arthropoda
- Class: Insecta
- Order: Coleoptera
- Suborder: Polyphaga
- Infraorder: Cucujiformia
- Family: Cerambycidae
- Genus: Rosalba
- Species: R. apiculata

Binomial name
- Rosalba apiculata (Galileo & Martins, 2006)

Synonyms
- Apyratuca apiculata Galileo & Martins, 2006

Genus of beetles

Rosalba apiculata is a species of beetle in the family Cerambycidae. It was described by Galileo and Martins in 2006.
