= Rosalba incrustabilis =

Scientific classification
- Kingdom: Animalia
- Phylum: Arthropoda
- Clade: Pancrustacea
- Class: Insecta
- Order: Coleoptera
- Suborder: Polyphaga
- Infraorder: Cucujiformia
- Family: Cerambycidae
- Genus: Rosalba
- Species: R. incrustabilis

Binomial name
- Rosalba incrustabilis Galileo & Martins, 2006

Synonyms
- Rosalba inscrustabilis Galileo & Martins, 2006

Species of beetle

Rosalba incrustabilis is a species of beetle in the family Cerambycidae. It was described by Galileo and Martins in 2006.
