= Rosalba alboapicalis =

Scientific classification
- Kingdom: Animalia
- Phylum: Arthropoda
- Class: Insecta
- Order: Coleoptera
- Suborder: Polyphaga
- Infraorder: Cucujiformia
- Family: Cerambycidae
- Genus: Rosalba
- Species: R. alboapicalis

Binomial name
- Rosalba alboapicalis (Breuning, 1940)

Species of beetle

Rosalba alboapicalis is a species of beetle in the family Cerambycidae. It was described by Breuning in 1940. It is known from Brazil.
