= Native rosella =

Native rosella may refer to certain plant species in the family Malvaceae:

- Abelmoschus ficulneus
- Hibiscus tiliaceus
- Hibiscus heterophyllus, native to New South Wales and Queensland

== See also ==
- Rosella (disambiguation)
