= Santa Rosalía =

Saint Rosalia, or Santa Rosalia (1130–1166), is the patron saint of Palermo, Italy.

Santa Rosalía or Santa Rosalia may also refer to:

== Places ==
- Santa Rosalía, Vichada, Colombia
  - Santa Rosalía Airport
- Santa Rosalía, Baja California Sur, Mexico
- Santa Rosalía, Chihuahua, a place in Matamoros, Mexico
- Santa Rosalía, Jalisco
- Santa Rosalía, Tamaulipas, a place in Mexican area code 891

== Other uses ==
- USS Santa Rosalia, a United States Navy cargo ship in commission 1918–1919
- Rosalia (given name), is given name
