= Rossella =

Rossella may refer to:

- Rossella (given name), female given name
- Rossella (TV series), an Italian television series
- Rossella (sponge), a genus of sponges in the family Rossellidae]

== See also ==
- Rosella (disambiguation)
- Rozella (disambiguation)
