= Rosalba arawakiana =

Scientific classification
- Kingdom: Animalia
- Phylum: Arthropoda
- Class: Insecta
- Order: Coleoptera
- Suborder: Polyphaga
- Infraorder: Cucujiformia
- Family: Cerambycidae
- Genus: Rosalba
- Species: R. arawakiana

Binomial name
- Rosalba arawakiana Villiers, 1980

Species of beetle

Rosalba arawakiana is a species of beetle in the family Cerambycidae. It was described by Villiers in 1980. It is known from Guadeloupe.
