= Rosaria =

Rosaria may refer to:

- Rosaria (album), a 1999 album by the London band Tiger
- Rosaria (given name)
