= Rosalia, Pisidia =

Ancient city in Pisidia, Asia Minor

See Rosalia for namesakes

Rosalia (in Pisidia) was an ancient city in Pisidia, Asia Minor, in modern Turkey. Its location is unknown.

== Ecclesiastical history ==
None of its bishops are known, nor which archbishopric it was attached to.

By 1687, the diocese was nominally restored as the Roman Catholic titular bishopric of Rosalia; it was suppressed by decree of Propaganda Fide in 1894.

== See also ==
- List of Catholic titular sees

== Sources ==
- GCatholic

Bibliography

- Konrad Eubel, Hierarchia Catholica Medii Aevi, vol. 5, p. 335; vol. 6, p. 358
- Gaetano Moroni, Dizionario di erudizione storico-ecclesiastica, vol. 59, p. 150
