= Roselle =

Roselle may refer to:

== People ==
- Mike Roselle - American environmental activist and author
- Roselle - Belgian singer
- Roselle Nava (born 1976) - Filipino actress, singer and politician

== Life ==
- Roselle - One of two American guide dogs who were with their owners in the World Trade Center during the September 11 attacks in New York City.
- Roselle (plant), a species of hibiscus (Hibiscus sabdariffa)
  - A drink made from that plant, also called "Hibiscus tea"

== Places ==
=== Italy ===
- Roselle, Italy in Grosseto province, site of the Etruscan town of Rusellae, a former Roman & medieval bishopric and present Latin Catholic titular see

=== United States ===
- Roselle, Illinois, a suburb of Chicago
  - Roselle station, a railroad station in the suburb
- Roselle, Missouri, an unincorporated community
- Roselle, New Jersey, a borough
- Roselle Park, New Jersey, a borough
  - Roselle Park station
- Roselle Township, Carroll County, Iowa

== Ships ==
- USS Roselle (AM-379), minesweeper launched 1944, sold to Mexico 1973
- USS Roselle (SP-350), a ship that served both as a tug and as minesweeper, in the early 20th century

== Schools ==
- Roselle Catholic High School, Roselle, New Jersey
- Roselle Park High School, Roselle Park, New Jersey
- Roselle Public Schools, Roselle, a school district
- Roselle Park School District, Roselle Park

== See also ==
- Rusellae
- Rosealia
- Rosette (disambiguation)
- Rosella (disambiguation)
- Rozelle (disambiguation)
