= Roselia =

Roselia may refer to:

- Roselia (band), a Japanese all-female band
- Roselia (Pokémon), a Pokémon species

== See also ==
- Lia, a feminine given name
- Rosalia (disambiguation)
- "Rosealia", a song by Better Than Ezra
