= Rosalba luteomaculata =

Scientific classification
- Kingdom: Animalia
- Phylum: Arthropoda
- Clade: Pancrustacea
- Class: Insecta
- Order: Coleoptera
- Suborder: Polyphaga
- Infraorder: Cucujiformia
- Family: Cerambycidae
- Genus: Rosalba
- Species: R. luteomaculata

Binomial name
- Rosalba luteomaculata Vlasák & Santos-Silva, 2025

Species of beetle

Rosalba luteomaculata is a species of beetle of the family Cerambycidae. It is found in Ecuador.

== Description ==
Adults reach a length of about 12.05 mm (0.474 in). The head capsule is mostly dark brown. The prothorax is dark brown, but darker reddish brown on the prosternal process. The scutellum is brown and the elytra are reddish brown with semi‑circular blackish macula.

== Etymology ==
The species name is derived from Latin luteus (meaning yellow) and maculatus (meaning spotted) and refers to the distinct small yellow maculae on the elytra.
