= Rosalba fimbriata =

Scientific classification
- Domain: Eukaryota
- Kingdom: Animalia
- Phylum: Arthropoda
- Class: Insecta
- Order: Coleoptera
- Suborder: Polyphaga
- Infraorder: Cucujiformia
- Family: Cerambycidae
- Genus: Rosalba
- Species: R. fimbriata

Binomial name
- Rosalba fimbriata (Belon, 1903)

Species of beetle

Rosalba fimbriata is a species of beetle in the family Cerambycidae. It was described by Belon in 1903. It is known from Bolivia.
