= Rosalba pulchella =

Scientific classification
- Domain: Eukaryota
- Kingdom: Animalia
- Phylum: Arthropoda
- Class: Insecta
- Order: Coleoptera
- Suborder: Polyphaga
- Infraorder: Cucujiformia
- Family: Cerambycidae
- Genus: Rosalba
- Species: R. pulchella

Binomial name
- Rosalba pulchella (Belon, 1903)

Species of beetle

Rosalba pulchella is a species of beetle in the family Cerambycidae. It was described by Belon in 1903. It is known from Brazil.
