= Rosalba cordigera =

Scientific classification
- Domain: Eukaryota
- Kingdom: Animalia
- Phylum: Arthropoda
- Class: Insecta
- Order: Coleoptera
- Suborder: Polyphaga
- Infraorder: Cucujiformia
- Family: Cerambycidae
- Genus: Rosalba
- Species: R. cordigera

Binomial name
- Rosalba cordigera (Aurivillius, 1920)

Species of beetle

Rosalba cordigera is a species of beetle in the family Cerambycidae. It was described by Per Olof Christopher Aurivillius in 1920.
