= Óscar Martín Ramos Salinas =

Mexican politician

- Born: 9 September 1963 (age 62); Tamaulipas, Mexico
- Occupation: Politician
- Political party: PRI, PANAL

Óscar Martín Ramos Salinas (born 9 September 1963) is a Mexican politician affiliated at different times with both the Institutional Revolutionary Party (PRI) and the New Alliance Party (PANAL).

In the 2003 mid-terms, he was elected to the Chamber of Deputies to represent Tamaulipas's 6th district during the 59th session of Congress. Originally elected for the PRI, he declared himself an independent on 16 March 2006.
