= Rosalba recta =

Scientific classification
- Domain: Eukaryota
- Kingdom: Animalia
- Phylum: Arthropoda
- Class: Insecta
- Order: Coleoptera
- Suborder: Polyphaga
- Infraorder: Cucujiformia
- Family: Cerambycidae
- Genus: Rosalba
- Species: R. recta

Binomial name
- Rosalba recta (Thomson, 1868)

Species of beetle

Rosalba recta is a species of beetle in the family Cerambycidae. It was described by Thomson in 1868. It is known from Venezuela.
