= Rosalba approximata =

Scientific classification
- Kingdom: Animalia
- Phylum: Arthropoda
- Clade: Pancrustacea
- Class: Insecta
- Order: Coleoptera
- Suborder: Polyphaga
- Infraorder: Cucujiformia
- Family: Cerambycidae
- Genus: Rosalba
- Species: R. approximata

Binomial name
- Rosalba approximata (Melzer, 1934)

Synonyms
- Aletretia approximata Melzer, 1934; Rosalia approximata Zajciw, 1972

Species of beetle

Rosalba approximata is a species of beetle in the family Cerambycidae. It was described by Melzer in 1934, and is known from Paraguay, Brazil (Minas Gerais, Espírito Santo, Rio de Janeiro, São Paulo, Paraná, Santa Catarina, Rio Grande do Sul) and Argentina (Chaco).
