= Rosalba (beetle) =

Scientific classification
- Kingdom: Animalia
- Phylum: Arthropoda
- Clade: Pancrustacea
- Class: Insecta
- Order: Coleoptera
- Suborder: Polyphaga
- Infraorder: Cucujiformia
- Family: Cerambycidae
- Subfamily: Lamiinae
- Tribe: Apomecynini
- Genus: Rosalba; Thomson, 1864

Synonyms
- Aletretia Bates, 1866; Apyratuca Galileo & Martins, 2006

Genus of beetles

Rosalba is a genus of beetles in the family Cerambycidae, containing the following species:

- Rosalba alboapicalis (Breuning, 1940)
- Rosalba alcidionoides Thomson, 1864
- Rosalba amazonica Galileo & Martins, 2013
- Rosalba apiculata (Galileo & Martins, 2006)
- Rosalba approximata (Melzer, 1934)
- Rosalba arawakiana Villiers, 1980
- Rosalba bezarki Santos-Silva & Galileo, 2018
- Rosalba bicolor (Audureau, 2016)
- Rosalba birai Santos-Silva & Galileo, 2018
- Rosalba bucki (Melzer, 1934)
- Rosalba cacapyra Galileo & Martins, 2013
- Rosalba cerdai Tavakilian, 2018
- Rosalba clinei Tavakilian, Santos-Silva & Galileo, 2018
- Rosalba contracta Bezark & Santos-Silva, 2019
- Rosalba cordigera (Aurivillius, 1920)
- Rosalba costaricensis (Melzer, 1934)
- Rosalba crassepunctata Breuning, 1948
- Rosalba dalensi Santos-Silva & Galileo, 2018
- Rosalba digna (Melzer, 1934)
- Rosalba fimbriata (Belon, 1903)
- Rosalba formosa Martins & Galileo, 2008
- Rosalba gaianii Joly, 2018
- Rosalba genieri Audureau, 2016
- Rosalba giesberti Santos-Silva & Galileo, 2018
- Rosalba giuglarisi Santos-Silva & Galileo, 2018
- Rosalba hovorei Touroult, 2007
- Rosalba incrustabilis Galileo & Martins, 2006
- Rosalba indistincta (Breuning, 1940)
- Rosalba inscripta (Bates, 1866)
- Rosalba jolyi Galileo & Martins, 2013
- Rosalba lingafelteri Santos-Silva & Galileo, 2018
- Rosalba luteomaculata Vlasák & Santos-Silva, 2025
- Rosalba maculosa Galileo & Martins, 2013
- Rosalba malleri (Melzer, 1934)
- Rosalba mediovittata Galileo & Martins, 2013
- Rosalba mediovittata Galileo & Martins, 2013
- Rosalba monnei Audureau, 2016
- Rosalba morrisi Santos-Silva & Galileo, 2018
- Rosalba nearnsi Santos-Silva & Galileo, 2018
- Rosalba obliqua (Thomson, 1868)
- Rosalba parva Galileo & Martins, 2013
- Rosalba peruviensis Audureau, 2016
- Rosalba pittieri Joly, 2018
- Rosalba pulchella (Belon, 1903)
- Rosalba recta (Thomson, 1868)
- Rosalba rufobasalis (Breuning, 1940)
- Rosalba schneppi Santos-Silva & Galileo, 2018
- Rosalba senecauxi Tavakilian, Santos-Silva & Galileo, 2018
- Rosalba seraisorum Tavakilian, Santos-Silva & Galileo, 2018
- Rosalba similis Joly, 2018
- Rosalba skelleyi Bezark & Santos-Silva, 2019
- Rosalba skillmani Santos-Silva & Galileo, 2018
- Rosalba smaragdina (Breuning, 1940)
- Rosalba stenodesma Joly, Tavakilian, Santos-Silva & Galileo, 2018
- Rosalba stigmatifera (Thomson, 1868)
- Rosalba strandi (Breuning, 1943)
- Rosalba strandiella (Breuning, 1940)
- Rosalba suiaba Martins & Galileo, 2009
- Rosalba tanimbuca Galileo & Martins, 2013
- Rosalba venusta Bezark & Santos-Silva, 2019
- Rosalba wappesi Santos-Silva & Galileo, 2018
