= Rose Wangui =

Kenyan journalist

- Born: Rose Wangui
- Education: International Journalism, Cardiff University, Wales
- Known for: Journalism

Rose Wangūi is a Kenyan reporter who received the Knight International Journalism Award, which was presented to her at the International Center for Journalists (ICFJ) 35th Annual Awards Dinner in 2019.
