= Rozelle (given name) =

Rozelle is a given name. Notable people with the given name include:

- Rozelle Claxton (1913–1995), American jazz pianist
- Rozelle Gayle (1919–1986), American jazz pianist, comic entertainer and actor
- Rozelle Scheepers (born 1974), South African cricketer

== See also ==
- Rozelle (surname)
