= Rosemond =

Rosemond is a surname. Notable people with the surname include:

- Anna Rosemond (1886–1966), American actress
- Clinton Rosemond (1882–1966), American actor
- John Rosemond (born 1947), American psychologist and author
- Ken Rosemond (1930–1993), American college basketball coach
- James Rosemond (born 1965), American record executive and criminal
