= Rose Seretse =

Personal details
- Born: Botswana
- Education: Bachelor of Construction Engineering and Management; Master of Public Administration
- Alma mater: Ferris State University; University of Botswana
- Occupation: Public administrator
- Known for: Anti-corruption initiatives and public sector leadership
- Awards: Africa’s Most Influential Woman (CEO Global, 2017); Commonwealth Secretariat Recognition (2018); Presidential Honour Award (2018)

Rose Seretse is the former CEO of the Botswana Energy Regulatory Authority. She previously was the Director General of the Botswana Directorate on Corruption and Economic Crime from 2009 until 2017. She has represented Botswana internationally for anti-corruption initiatives.

== Education ==
Rose Seretse holds a Masters in Public Administration from the University of Botswana. She also holds a Bachelor of Construction Engineering and Management from Ferris State University in the United States.

== Career ==
She started her work as Senior Technical Officer at the Kgalagadi District Council and the Lobatse Town Council. She joined the Directorate on Corruption and Economic Crime in 1997, where she started working mainly at corruption prevention in the construction industry. She later moved to the public education division within the Directorate. Her role was to educate the public on evils of corruption and to get their support. She moved from the education division to the Human Resource and Administration division where she was responsible for the administration aspect of the Directorate. She was again moved to the division of performance improvement, or Performance Management System (PMS), where she coordinated Performance Improvement Activities of the Directorate on Corruption. She was appointed deputy director in 2007 and became Director General in 2009.

Seretse is a cousin by marriage to Ramadeluka Seretse, the cousin of former President Ian Khama. In 2017, Seretse was removed from her position as Director General at DCEC and transferred to the Botswana Energy Regulatory Authority (BERA). In 2018, she was given an award by Rt. Hon. Patricia Scotland QC, Commonwealth Secretary-General, on behalf of the Commonwealth Secretariat, for her work on the Commonwealth Africa Anti-Corruption Centre. In 2019, BERA was investigated for its financial practices, and the appointment of Sereste was also investigated.

=== Awards ===
- Outstanding student Award – Ferris State University
- Sigma Lambda Chi
- Long service Good Conduct
- Certificate of Appreciation by the International Law Enforcement Academy
- Africa’ Most Influential Woman – CEO Global 2017
- Commonwealth Secretariat Recognition 2018
- Presidential Honour award on 29 September 2018

=== International presentation ===
- Accountability in Government and Business – Washington, D.C.
- Fighting Corruption is a Journey – Oslo Norway
- Corruption Prevention in the Workplace – Shanghai China
- Effective Tools for fighting Corruption – Sweden
- High Level Anti-Corruption Conference – Tanzania
- Various Panel discussions internationally
