= Rosaria (given name) =

Rosaria is the Italian feminine form of Rosario. Notable people with the name include:

== First name ==
- Rosaria Capacchione, Italian journalist and politician
- Rosaria Console, Italian runner
- Rosaria Conte, Italian social scientist
- Rosaria Piomelli, Italian architect
- Rosaria Salerno, Italian American politician

== Middle name ==
- Maria Rosaria Manieri (born 1943), Italian academic and socialist politician

== Fictional characters ==
- Rosaria, a character in 2020 video game Genshin Impact

== See also ==
- Rosaria (disambiguation)
- Rosario (given name)
