= Luis Alejandro Guevara =

Mexican politician

- Born: 26 August 1975 (age 50); Ciudad Mante, Tamaulipas, Mexico
- Education: Universidad Valle del Bravo
- Occupation: Politician
- Political party: PRI

Luis Alejandro Guevara Cobos (born 26 August 1975) is a Mexican politician affiliated with the Institutional Revolutionary Party (PRI).

In the 2009 mid-terms, he was elected to the Chamber of Deputies to represent Tamaulipas's 6th district during the 61st session of Congress. In the 2015 mid-terms, he was re-elected for the same seat, serving during the 63rd session.

He also served as a plurinominal deputy in the 57th session of Congress (1997–2000).
