= El Mante Municipality =

Coordinates: 22°44′N 98°58′W

El Mante
- Municipality
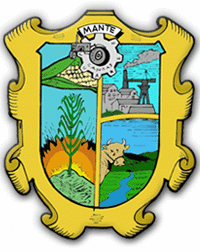
- Coat of arms

- Location in Mexico El Mante (Mexico)
- Country: Mexico
- State: Tamaulipas
- Demonym: (in Spanish)
- Time zone: UTC−6 (CST)

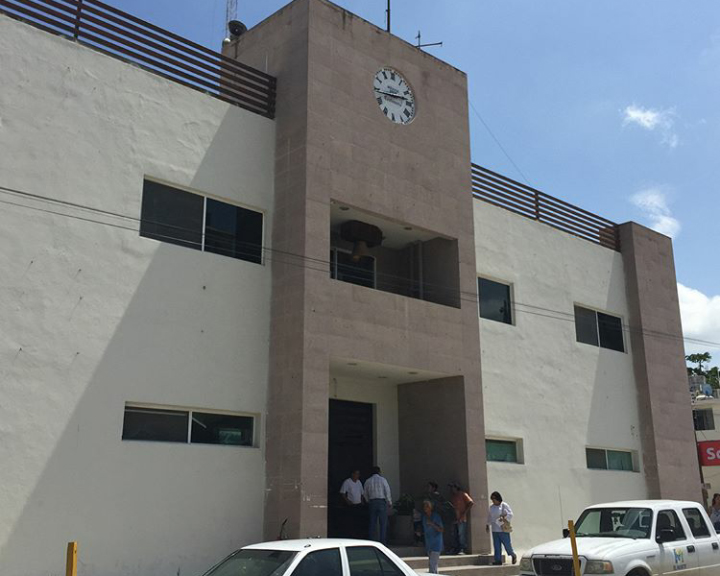
Presidencia Municipal

El Mante Municipality is a municipality located in the Mexican state of Tamaulipas.
