= Rose Perussi =

Rose Perussi (born in São Paulo, Brazil) is a Brazilian contemporary visual artist, writer, and art journalist. Beginning her artistic studies in São Paulo, she later integrated a strong focus on sustainability and environmental consciousness into her practice, utilizing recyclable materials in her creative processes. Her project Oribombo emerged from experiments with discarded materials sourced from the metallurgical industry, applied across diverse art forms.

Perussi's works have been represented by international auction houses, art galleries, and public institutions, including the São Paulo Metro (as part of Ação Cultural do Metrô São Paulo, 2004–2009) and the Mostra de Arte Brasileira 2009. Her pieces are also held in museum collections worldwide. She has participated in solo and group exhibitions at prominent venues such as the Salon d'Automne (notably its inaugural Brazilian edition in São Paulo, 2013), as well as in Chaves, Portugal; Alpicat, Spain; and Naples, Italy. Her work has also been featured in niche art events, including Brazil 100 Times Winner Formula 1.

Perussi holds a master's degree in Art History from the University of São Paulo. In 2014, she formally established Oribombo as a postmodern art movement, characterized by an original hybrid technique combining painting, engraving, sculpture, and collage.
