= Rozelle (surname) =

Rozelle is a surname. Notable people with the surname include:

- Carrie Rozelle (1937–2007), Canadian-born American disabilities activist
- Pete Rozelle (1926–1996), American businessman executive
- Ron Rozelle, American author
- Scott Rozelle (born 1955), American development economist

== See also ==
- Rozelle (given name)
