= Lokalia Montgomery =

American Hawaiian cultural historian, artist (1903–1978)

- Born: Rosalie Lokalia Lovelle; February 22, 1903; Kapa'a, Kauai, Territory of Hawaii (now Hawai'i, United States)
- Died: February 26, 1978 (aged 75); Lihue, Kauai, Hawaii, United States
- Burial place: National Memorial Cemetery of the Pacific, Honolulu, O'ahu, Hawaii, United States
- Other names: Rosalie Lokalia Lovelle Montgomery, Lokalia Montgomery, Rosalie Lokalia, Rosalie L. Montgomery
- Occupation(s): Musician, hula dancer, featherworker, Hawaiian chanter, curator, probation officer
- Known for: Hawaiian cultural historian and authority
- Spouse: Timothy Makaleilaaupiionakaia Montgomery (m. 1926–1967; his death)
- Children: 1
- Awards: Living Treasure of Hawaii (1977), Hawaiian Music Hall of Fame (2015)

Lōkālia Montgomery (née Rosalie Lokalia Lovelle; February 22, 1903 – February 26, 1978) was an American Hawaiian scholar, and multidisciplinary artist. She also worked as a curator, and a probation officer. Montgomery was knowledgeable in a diversity of Native Hawaiian cultural and traditional arts, including hula, featherwork, playing various instruments, and chanting. She used various names, including Rosalie Lokalia Lovelle Montgomery, Rosalie Lokalia Montgomery, Rosalie Lokalia, and Rosalie L. Montgomery.

== Early life and family ==
Rosalie Lokalia Lovelle was born on February 22, 1903, in Kapa'a, Kauai, Territory of Hawaii (now Hawai'i, United States). Her parents were Wilhelmina (née Keick) and Charles John Lovell Sr..

She married Timothy Makaleilaaupiionakaia Montgomery (or T.M. Montgomery; 1902–1967) in 1926, a musician of traditional Hawaiian instruments. They had a daughter, and remained married until his death in 1967.

== Career ==
Montgomery worked as a probation officer for the juvenile court in Honolulu from 1931 until 1955. Followed by work from 1957 to 1967, at Huliheʻe Palace museum in Kailua–Kona, in the state of Hawaii. She had been a student of Mary Kawena Pukui, and Keaka Kanahele.

Montgomery taught traditional Hawaiian featherwork, performed in Hawaiian cultural programs (including in hula, chanting), and taught about traditional Hawaiian musical instruments. She directed many Aloha Week pageants. In 1971, she performed at the National Folk Festival in Vienna, Virginia, near Washington, D.C. She also appeared on Mele Hawaii on KHET-TV, and performed at the Governor's Awards Ceremony for Mary Kawena Pukui in 1974.

Montgomery was awarded the Living Treasure of Hawaii award (1977), by the Honpa Hongwanji Mission of Hawaii; and awarded the "State of Hawai'i Order of Distinction" by the Hawaiʻi State Foundation on Culture and the Arts (1973). She entered Hawaiian Music Hall of Fame in 2015.

She was a member of the Daughters of Hawaii, the Pennet Gallery Group, and the Hawaiian National Music Foundation. Montgomery was featured in the film, Kumu Hula: Keepers of a Culture (1989) by Robert Mugge and Vicky Holt Takamine.

== Death ==
Montgomery died on February 26, 1978, in Wilcox Memorial Hospital (now Wilcox Medical Center) in Lihue, Kauai, Hawaii. She is buried at the National Memorial Cemetery of the Pacific in Honolulu.
