= Rose Hamburger =

American racetrack handicapper

- Born: Rose Rosenbaum; December 29, 1890; New York City
- Died: August 6, 1996 (aged 105); New York City
- Other name: Gamblin' Rose
- Education: Normal College
- Occupations: Racetrack handicapper, real estate agent
- Known for: Racing handicapper for the New York Post, beginning on her 105th birthday
- Spouse: Mark Hamburger (his death)
- Children: 2 daughters

Rose Hamburger (December 29, 1890 – August 6, 1996) was a racetrack fixture and handicapper for the New York Post for seven months starting at age 105. This stint at the Post earned her a cameo on the Late Show with David Letterman and the monikers "Gamblin' Rose" and "Gambling Rose".

== Background ==
Born as Rose Rosenbaum in Manhattan on December 29, 1890, she graduated from Normal College (formerly known as the Female Normal and High School) and the precursor of Hunter College, in 1910 at age 19, with degrees in mathematics and music. According to an article based on a 1995 interview, she enrolled in 1907.

According to her obituary in The New York Times, Rose Rosenbaum was at that time the youngest graduate in the college's history. She went to her first horse race in Germany and after returning to the United States she attended most, if not all, the Preakness Stakes between 1915 (or 1918) and 1988 (or 1992).

She married Mark Hamburger and became the first woman licensed in Baltimore to sell real estate (at age 47, in 1938). She still managed her schedule so she could make it to the track at Pimlico almost every day. In 1975 she moved back to Manhattan to be near her children. She gave up selling real estate to become a rental agent for a Manhattan building, but eventually returned to selling real estate, retiring in 1990, aged 99, only because, at that time, as she put it: [The New York real estate] market had been absurdly bad ... I miss it—life is without a challenge.

She focused on the track becoming a regular at the Aqueduct and Belmont Racetracks. She began to get a lot of attention after she turned 100. She came out of retirement to be a racing handicapper for the New York Post, beginning work on her 105th birthday.

She appeared on Late Night With David Letterman and other television programs. She died four months later at St. Vincent's Hospital in New York, on August 6, 1996, aged 105.
