= Rosella (disambiguation) =

Rosella is a genus of broad-tailed parrots endemic to Australasia.

Rosella may also refer to:

- Roselle (plant), a species of hibiscus (Hibiscus sabdariffa), also known as "rosella".
  - A drink made from that plant, also called "Hibiscus tea".
- Rosella (brand), a brand of Australian tomato sauce, soups, and chutney.
- MS Rosella, a cruiseferry, built in 1980 by Wärtsilä Turku shipyard (now Aker Finnyards), Finland

== People (real and fictional) ==
- Rosella Ayane, English footballer
- Rosella Cicognani, Italian gymnast
- Rosella Hightower, American ballerina
- Rosella Kanarik, American mathematics professor and educator
- Rosella Lau, Hong Kong model
- Rosella Namok, Australian artist
- Rosella Postorino, Italian author
- Rosella Sensi, Italian entrepreneur
- Rosella Towne, American actress
- Laura Rosella, Canadian epidemiologist
- Princess Rosella, a fictional video game character in the King's Quest series by Sierra On-Line
- Princess Rosella "Ro", a fictional character played by Barbie in the 2007 animated film Barbie as the Island Princess

== See also ==
- Native rosella (disambiguation)
- Rosalie (disambiguation)
- Roselle (disambiguation)
- Roseola, a childhood disease
- Rossella (disambiguation)
- Rozella (disambiguation)
