= Rosalba de la Cruz Requena =

Mexican politician

- Born: 4 April 1954 (age 72); Tamaulipas, Mexico
- Occupation: Politician
- Political party: PRI

Rosalba de la Cruz Requena (born 4 April 1954) is a Mexican politician affiliated with the Institutional Revolutionary Party (PRI). In the 2012 general election, she was elected to the Chamber of Deputies to represent Tamaulipas's 6th district during the 62nd session of Congress.
