= Patricia Gaffney =

American novelist

- Born: December 27, 1944 (age 81); Tampa, Florida, U.S.
- Occupation: Novelist
- Writing career
- Period: 1989–present
- Genres: Romance, Women's fiction
- Website: www.patriciagaffney.com

Patricia Gaffney (born December 27, 1944) is an American writer of romance novels and women's fiction novels.

== Biography ==
Patricia Gaffney was born on December 27, 1944, in Tampa, Florida, United States. She is the daughter of Joem and Jim Gaffney. She and her brother, Mike, grew up in Bethesda, Maryland.

Patricia graduated from Walter Johnson High School. She earned a bachelor's degree in English and Philosophy from Marymount College in Tarrytown, New York, and also studied literature at the Royal Holloway College at the University of London, at George Washington University, and at the University of North Carolina at Chapel Hill.

After college, Gaffney taught high school English for a year before pursuing a career as a freelance court reporter for the next five years. In 1984, Gafffney was diagnosed with breast cancer, which prompted her to live out her dream of writing books and living in the country. In 1986, she and her husband moved to rural Pennsylvania, where they continue to live.

== Bibliography ==
=== Historical Novels ===
==== Single novels ====
- Fortune's Lady (Sep 1989)
- Sweet Treason (Mar 1992)
- Another Eden (Oct 1992)
- Thief of Hearts (Jun 1993)
- Crooked Hearts (Aug 1994)
- Sweet Everlasting (Sep 1994)
- Lily (Jun 1996)
- Wild at Heart (Jan 1997)
- Outlaw in Paradise (Aug 1997)

==== Wickerley Series ====
1. To Love and to Cherish (Feb 1995)
2. To Have and to Hold (Sep 1995)
3. Forever and Ever (Apr 1996)

=== Contemporary Novels ===
==== Single novels ====
- The Saving Graces (Jul 1999)
- Circle of Three (Jul 2000)
- Flight Lessons (Oct 2002)
- The Goodbye Summer (Apr 2004)
- Mad Dash (Aug 2007)

==== Omnibus ====
- Omnibus of 3 novels (May 2005)
  - The Saving Graces
  - Circle of Three
  - Flight Lessons
- The Lost (Nov 2009)
  - The Dog Days of Laurie Summer
- The Other Side (Nov 2010)
  - The Dancing Ghost
- The Unquiet (Sep 2011)
  - Dear One

=== Non-fiction ===
- "Coming Out of the Closet And Locking It Behind Us" essay in North American Romance Writers (1999, ISBN 0810836041)
