= Rose Zeller =

New Zealand artist, writer and teacher (1891–1975)

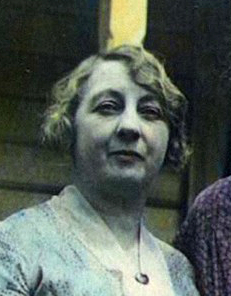
- Rose Zeller c. 1940. Hand-coloured by Daisy Osborn
- Born: 13 April 1891; Christchurch, New Zealand
- Died: 1 December 1975 (aged 84)

Rose Margaret Zeller (13 April 1891 – 1 December 1975) was a New Zealand artist.

== Biography ==
Zeller was born at the family home at 325 Cashel Street, Christchurch, New Zealand, where she lived until her death.

Her parents were Hubert Andrew Zeller and Sarah Ann Zeller, who had arrived in New Zealand from London in 1890.

Zeller studied at the Canterbury College of Arts from 1909 to 1913 alongside Grace Butler and Annie Gibb. To fund her studies, she was awarded the Applied Art scholarship in 1910. At the annual exhibition of work by pupils in 1913, the year she graduated, Zeller's work was described as "a very strong piece of work (which) attracts at once by its uncommonness."

After finishing her studies, Zeller taught crafts at Dunedin School of Art between 1915 and 1920, and later went on to complete a Diploma in Fine Arts specialising in History of Art in 1932. Following this she was appointed art mistress at the Christchurch Technical College.

Between 1927 and 1931 she showed around twenty-eight paintings at the annual exhibitions of the Canterbury Society of Arts, and was also a member of the organisation. In 1931 the subject matter of her paintings became more focused on religious and spiritual matters, in particular a number of representations of churches which she chose for her submissions to the CSA annual exhibition.

According to her friend and neighbour Henry Maitland Tomlinson, who later donated some of her works to the Dunedin Public Art Gallery, Zeller became ill in the 1940s and began to withdraw from society.

Zeller died in the family home on 1 December 1975.
