= Plague Chapel of St. Rosalie =

One-nave chapel in Košice, eastern Slovakia

Coordinates: 48°43′59″N 21°14′0″E

The Plague Chapel of St. Rosalie (Slovak: Morová kaplnka sv. Rozálie, Hungarian: Szent Rozália-kápolna) in Košice was built at the bottom of Red bank, according to work of T. Tornyossy and J. Goresch (together with J.E. Widman's collaboration), near the cemetery in 1714–1715 as the memorial of the plague from 1710 to 1711. The chapel was successfully erected in 1785, thanks to the foundation of priest Józef Sztolzman. In 1898 Jan Balogh restored it. At that time its interior was renewed and completed as well.

It is a one-nave chapel of a trunk structure with a tower covered with an onion-shaped helmet with a lantern. Interior decoration is from the turn of the 18th / 19th centuries. On the rood-screen beam there are statues of St. Rosalie and carvings of putti holding an hourglass and a skull. In the main altar of the 18th century there is a modern painting depicting St. Rosalie. There are also two side altars with statues of the Holy Virgin and St. Theresa.

== Gallery ==
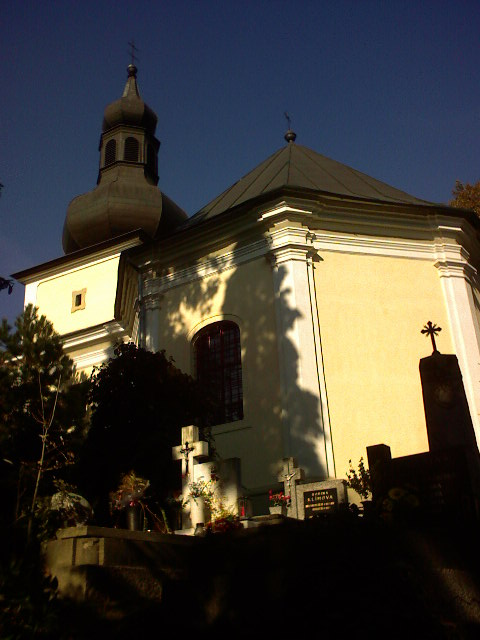

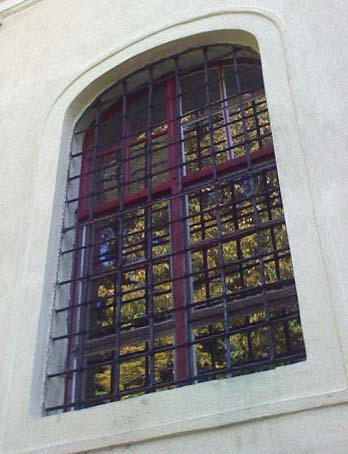
