= Ocampo, Tamaulipas =

City in Tamaulipas, Mexico

Coordinates: 22.833°N 99.333°W

Ocampo, Tamaulipas

Ciudad Ocampo in Ocampo Municipality in the Mexican state of Tamaulipas was founded on May 19, 1749, as Villa of Santa Bárbara; the town became known as Ocampo in 1869. The credit for the founding of Santa Barbara is given to Don José Escandón y Helguera. It is at the southern border of the state, among the Sierra Madre Oriental Mountains. Surrounded by green mountains and hundreds of farms, it is known as "El Vergel de Tamaulipas", the Orchard of Tamaulipas. The name Ocampo is so named in honor of the reformist Melchor Ocampo.

== History ==
Population founded by Jose de Escandón on 19 May 1749 with the name of Santa Barbara, in the called site Tanguachín, place in that 460 Valley families had settled down, to that several rancherías indigenous added themselves to them. He was his first captain Juan Francisco Barberena, with political and military jurisdiction on the villa. When being united to the expedition of Escandón to colonize the New Santander, it was left Tomás of Grove like lieutenant of the villa. The following year, the Mission of Igollo settled down, that congregated to natives of the groups pames and janambres, and was administered by the monk Francisco Escandón and Helguera, brother of the count of Fat Mountain range.

In 1757, the villa had 479 inhabitants dedicated to agriculture, "whom supply of maize to many parts of the colony and also they removed it to sell outside" and she was surrounded by farms dedicated to the cattle ranch. Due to a flood which they suffered in 1757, the villa and the mission were changed to the site in which at the moment they are. In 1770 the villa had 550 inhabitants, without telling the children; the mission of Our Lady of the Solitude of Igollo congregated to 243 natives pames and six families of pizones; his monk, White Joaquin, of Custodia de Tampico, followed with the work of the temple "whose plant is magnificent and beautiful".

Santa Barbara, by its wealth received the name of Orchard of Tamaulipas. From 1869, the villa was called Ocampo, in memory of the illustrious reformist Melchor Ocampo and in 1898 it rose to the category of city.

== Culture ==
Ocampo's rich past and distance from other cities gives the community its garnish of uniqueness and heritage. 87 percent of the population is Catholic, worshipping in the church La Parroquia de Santa Barbara, which is located the town center. Every December 4, celebration fills the town as they honor the martyr St. Barbara. Many take advantage of this time to baptize, confirm, or make the first communion for their children.

The town celebrates its founding annually with a fair through the week of May 19.

== Local attractions ==
Place	Description
The Museum "Rufino Muñiz Torres"	Located two blocks from the town center, this one room museum has many interesting artifacts that reveal the fascinating history of Ocampo. Learn about the inhabitants of the area before the arrival of the Spanish. Admission is free.
La Alberca (The Pond)	This park is located just outside the city. Picnic tables and grills are available for use. Beautifully shaded by many trees. Great for recreational purposes.
La Poza Madre (The Mother Poza)	Located 4.5 kilometers to the south of the Ejido Chamal Viejo, this area allows tourists to make long walks and strolls, horse-ride, practice swimming, fishing and view the beautiful mountainous landscape.
The Cabins of "Obelisco"	A stony formation of natural origin that resembles an impressive monolith, Obelisco is about 17 km north of the city. Located in the southern part of the biosphere reserve "El Cielo(Heaven)", Obelisco is on a hill that rises 7 km. It takes approx. takes 1½ to 2 hours to arrive here from Ocampo. Here one will be able to commune with nature. Currently there are three cabins available that fit 6 people each. For more information go to the Municipal Presidency in Ocampo.

== Geography ==
The municipal head is located in the city of Ocampo, between the parallels 22º50' of north latitude and to 99º22' of west longitude, to a height of 1.173 meters on the level of the sea. The city lies in a valley in the Sierra Madre Oriental. Colinda to the north with the municipalities of Tula and Jaumave; to the south with the State of San Luis Potosí and the Municipalities of Old and New Morelos; to the east with Gómez Farías and Mante and to the west with Tula and San Luis Potosí.
