= Rosario (given name) =

Rosario is a given name originating from Italian, Spanish and Portuguese Roman Catholicism in which the Virgin Mary is titled "Our Lady of the Rosary." In Italian, it is a masculine name, with a diminutive of Saro and its female equivalent being Rosaria. In Spanish, it is a unisex name, although typically feminine. It may refer to:

== People ==
- Rosario Assunto, Italian philosopher
- Rosario Benavent, Catalan activist
- Rosario Bourdon, Canadian musician
- Rosario Bufalino, better known as Russell Bufalino, boss of the Bufalino crime family
- Rosario Candela, Italian-born American architect
- Rosario Castellanos, Mexican poet
- Rosario Dawson, American actress
- Rosario DeSimone, Italian mobster
- Rosario Di Bella, Italian composer and singer-songwriter
- Rosario Etchebarne, Uruguayan Bioconstruction architect
- Rosario Francesco Esposito, Italian Roman Catholic priest
- Rosario Fernández, Peruvian politician, 147th Prime Minister of Peru
- Rosario Flores, Spanish singer and actress
- Rosario Gambino, Italian mobster
- Rosario Hernández Diéguez, Spanish newspaper hawker and trade unionist
- Rosario Ibarra, Mexican politician
- Rosario La Mastra, Italian sprinter
- Rosario La Spina, Australian tenor
- Rosario Maceo, Italian mobster
- Rosario Marin, United States Treasurer
- Rosario Martinelli, Italian midfielder
- Rosario Martínez (athlete), Salvadoran shot putter
- Rosario Martínez, Uruguayan football manager
- Rosario Murillo, Nicaraguan politician, co-president since 2025
- Rosario Nadal, Princess of Preslav, Spanish art director
- Rosario Prieto, actress from the Dominican Republic
- Rosario Priolo, Chicago mobster
- Rosario Robles, Mexican politician
- Rosario Sánchez, Mexican race walker
- Rosario Silva de Lapuerta, Spanish judge in Luxembourg
- Rosario Zúñiga, Mexican actress

== Fictional people ==
- Rosario, character from the manga Dragon Half
- Rosario Corso, a Season 2 contestant in Fetch! with Ruff Ruffman
- Rosario + Vampire, a manga about a human living at a monster high school
- Rosario "Pol" Blancanales, a character from The Executioner (book series) universe
- Rosario Salazar, a character on the American television sitcom Will & Grace
- Rosario Central, a character from the Chilean comedy series 31 Minutos

== See also ==
- Charo (name), Spanish diminutive for Rosario
