= Růžená =

- Municipality
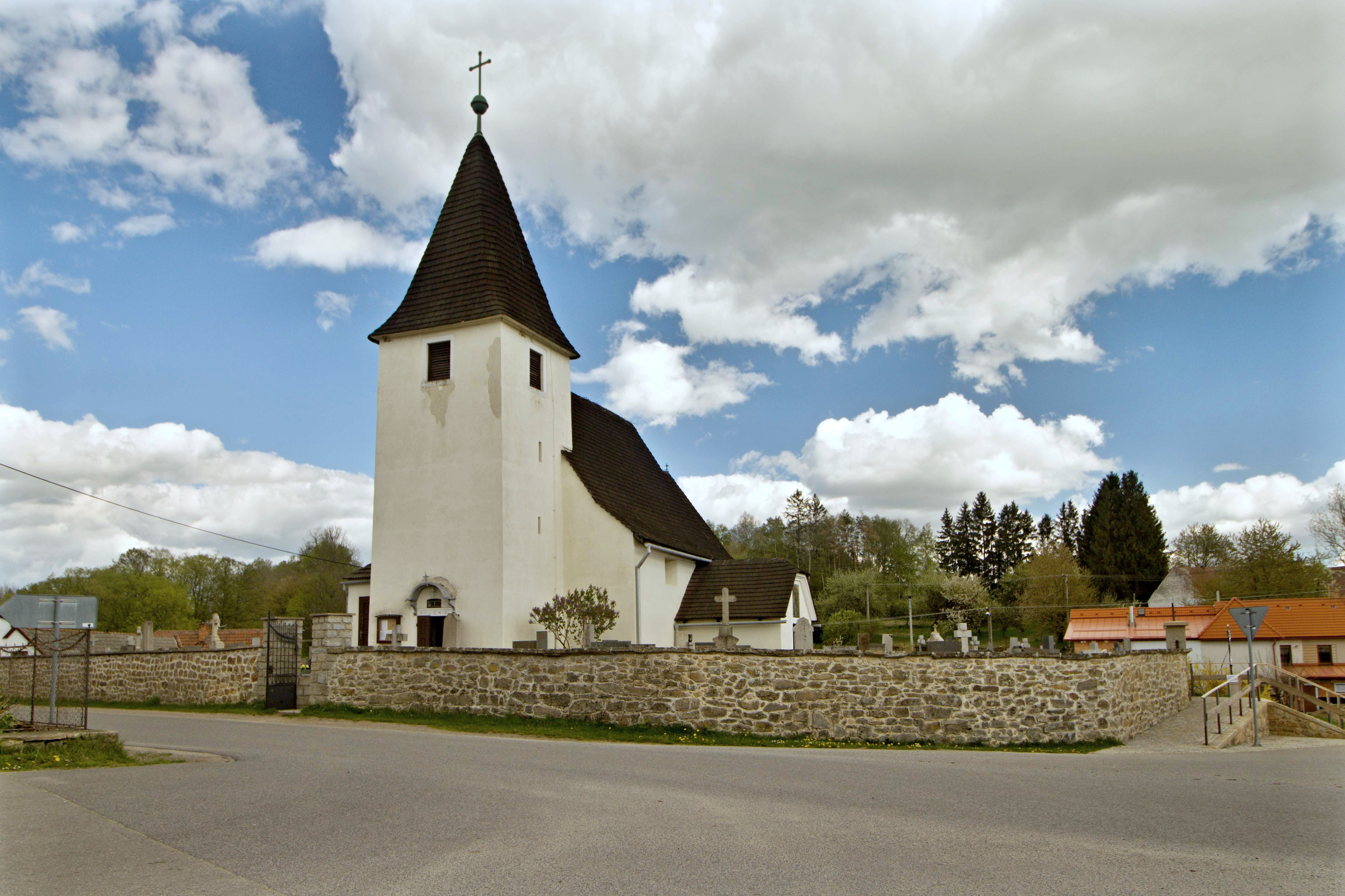
- Church of Saint Mary Magdalene

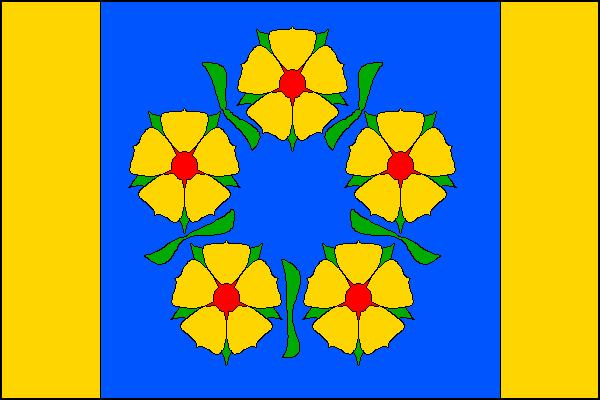
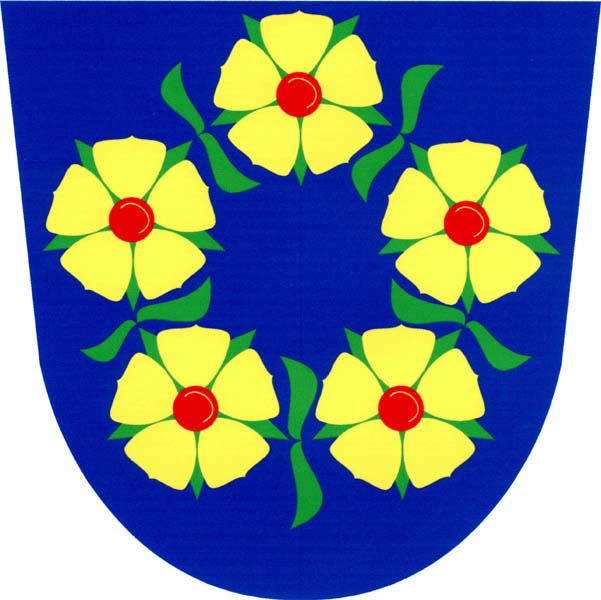
- Flag Coat of arms

- Location in the Czech Republic
- Coordinates: 49°16′14″N 15°25′42″E
- Country: Czech Republic
- Region: Vysočina
- District: Jihlava
- First mentioned: 1483

Area
  - Total: 5.51 km^{2} (2.13 sq mi)
- Elevation: 604 m (1,982 ft)

Population (2026-01-01)
  - Total: 334
  - Density: 60.6/km^{2} (157/sq mi)
- Time zone: UTC+1 (CET)
  - Summer (DST): UTC+2 (CEST)
- Postal code: 589 01
- Website: ruzena.cz

Růžená (Czech pronunciation: [ˈruːʒɛnaː]) is a municipality and village in Jihlava District in the Vysočina Region of the Czech Republic. It has about 300 inhabitants.

Růžená lies approximately 19 kilometres (12 mi) south-west of Jihlava and 116 km (72 mi) south-east of Prague.

== Demographics ==
Historical population
Year	Pop.	±%
1869	332	—
1880	333	+0.3%
1890	332	−0.3%
1900	339	+2.1%
1910	386	+13.9%
1921	350	−9.3%
1930	384	+9.7%
1950	329	−14.3%
1961	316	−4.0%
1970	315	−0.3%
1980	304	−3.5%
1991	306	+0.7%
2001	293	−4.2%
2011	334	+14.0%
2021	331	−0.9%
Source: Censuses
