= Rose Williams (artist) =

Navajo potter

- Born: 1915
- Died: 2015 (aged 99–100)
- Occupation: Navajo potter

Rose Williams (c. 1915–2015) was a Navajo potter credited with renewing interest in the Navajo pottery tradition.

== Career ==
Williams was a member of the most important family of Navajo potters, including her daughter Alice Cling and her aunt Grace Barlow. Rose was trained by Barlow, and trained her daughter Cling, in turn; the three of them are credited with reviving the Navajo pottery tradition during the 20th century. By tradition, Navajo pottery was used domestically or ceremonially and was characterized by a utilitarian aesthetic; the Williams family helped define the aesthetic of contemporary Navajo pottery, enabling its inclusion in the growing market for Native American crafts.

Williams learned the craft of pottery as an adult. She began selling pottery after her husband died when she was 40 years old.

== Personal life ==
Williams had 12 children, four girls and eight boys, although two children are deceased. Rose was said to be an amazing person with so much character and courage. She was said to have always lit up others' days with her smile and silly jokes. She spoke Navajo almost exclusively.
