= Cow Springs, Arizona =

- Populated place
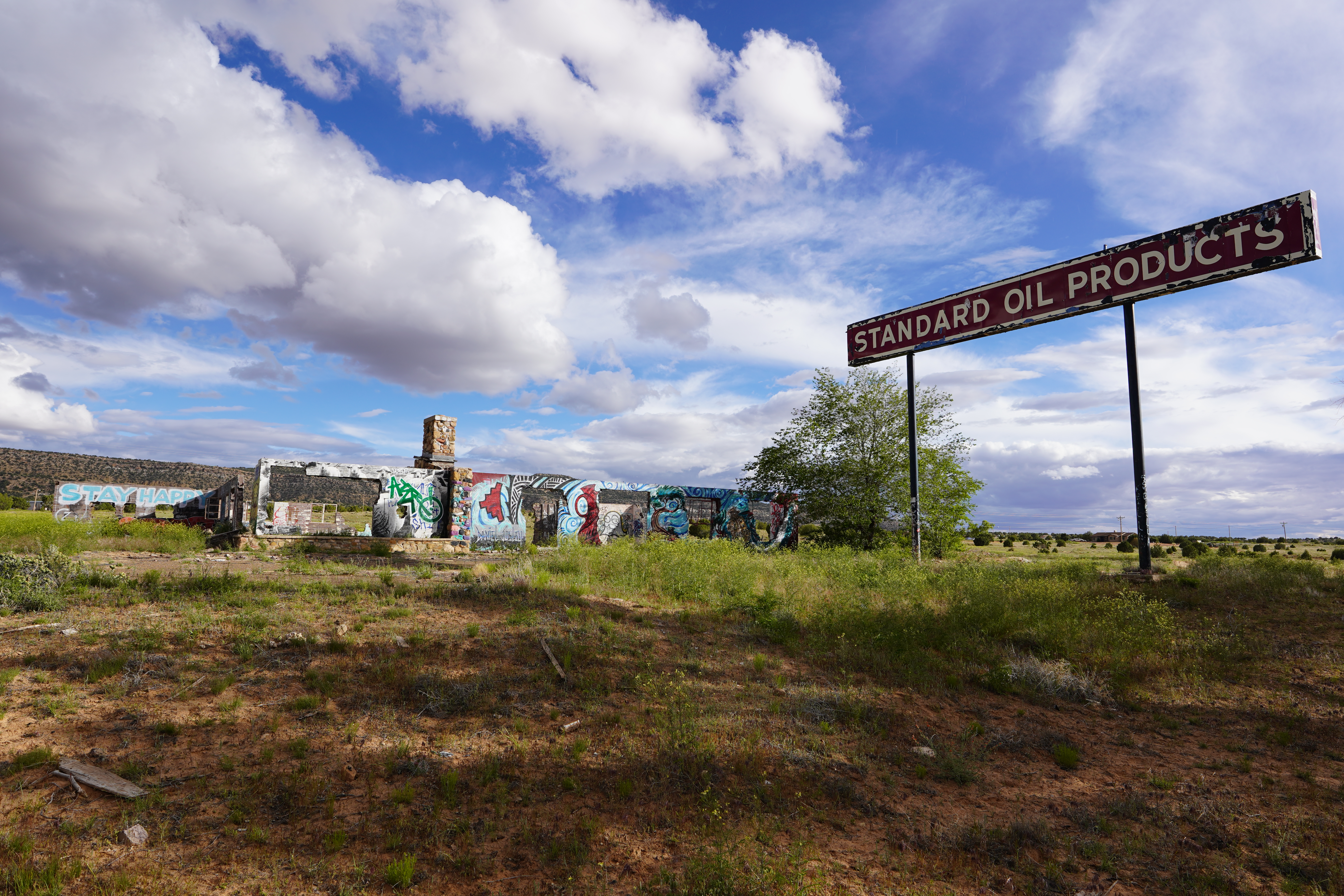
- Cow Springs Trading Post ruins

- Location within the state of Arizona Cow Springs, Arizona (the United States)
- Coordinates: 36°24′47″N 110°49′21″W
- Country: United States
- State: Arizona
- County: Coconino
- Elevation: 5,863 ft (1,787 m)
- Time zone: UTC-7 (Mountain (MST))
  - Summer (DST): UTC-7 (MST)
- Area code: 928
- FIPS code: 04-16900
- GNIS feature ID: 24388

Cow Springs is a populated place situated in Coconino County, Arizona, United States. It has an estimated elevation of 5,863 feet (1,787 m) above sea level.
