= 1856 Růžena =

Stony main-belt asteroid

Discovery
- Discovered by: L. Chernykh
- Discovery site: Crimean Astrophysical Obs.
- Discovery date: 8 October 1969

Designations
- Named after: Růžena Petrovicova (Kleť Observatory)
- Alternative designations: 1969 TW_{1} · 1941 FP; 1971 DL_{1}
- Minor planet category: main-belt · (inner)

Orbital characteristics
- Epoch 4 September 2017 (JD 2458000.5)
- Uncertainty parameter 0
- Observation arc: 47.47 yr (17,339 days)
- Aphelion: 2.4146 AU
- Perihelion: 2.0586 AU
- Semi-major axis: 2.2366 AU
- Eccentricity: 0.0796
- Orbital period (sidereal): 3.34 yr (1,222 days)
- Mean anomaly: 251.86°
- Mean motion: 0° 17^{m} 40.92^{s} / day
- Inclination: 4.7421°
- Longitude of ascending node: 185.88°
- Argument of perihelion: 56.000°

Physical characteristics
- Dimensions: 6.620±0.252 km
- Geometric albedo: 0.335±0.033
- Spectral type: SMASS = S
- Absolute magnitude (H): 12.8

1856 Růžena, provisional designation 1969 TW_{1}, is a stony asteroid from the inner regions of the asteroid belt, approximately 6.6 kilometers in diameter. It was discovered on 8 October 1969, by Russian astronomer Lyudmila Chernykh at Crimean Astrophysical Observatory in Nauchny, on the Crimean peninsula. The asteroid was named after Růžena Petrovicova, staff member at Kleť Observatory.

== Orbit and classification ==
Růžena orbits the Sun in the inner main-belt at a distance of 2.1–2.4 AU once every 3 years and 4 months (1,222 days). Its orbit has an eccentricity of 0.08 and an inclination of 5° with respect to the ecliptic. The asteroid was first identified as 1941 FP at the Finnish Iso-Heikkilä Observatory. The body's observation arc, however, starts with its official discovery observation at Nauchnyj in 1969.

== Physical characteristics ==
Růžena is a bright S-type asteroid in the SMASS classification.

According to the survey carried out by NASA's Wide-field Infrared Survey Explorer with its subsequent NEOWISE mission, Růžena measures 6.62 kilometers in diameter and its surface has an albedo of 0.335. As of 2016, the body's rotation period and shape remain unknown.

== Naming ==
This asteroid was named in honor of Růžena Petrovicova, observer of comets and minor planets and staff member of the Kleť Observatory, located in what is now the Czech Republic. The official naming citation was published by the Minor Planet Center on 1 June 1975 (M.P.C. 3825).
