= Rose Gaffney =

American environmental activist

Rose Gaffney (1895–1974) was an environmental activist known for fighting the construction of the Bodega Bay Nuclear Power Plant in Sonoma County, California. She is sometimes referred to as the "mother of ecology." In 2003, she was the subject of a documentary called "Rose Gaffney: The Belle of Bodega Bay."

== Early life ==
The daughter of Polish immigrants, Rose Gaffney came to Bodega Bay at the age of 16. With only an eighth grade education, she rode the trains down from Canada to work for the man who later became her husband. Her husband died in 1941, leaving Gaffney to inherit property on Bodega Head that her father in-law purchased in 1863.

== Bodega Head ==
Gaffney owned 482 acres on Bodega Head, a strip of land jutting off from the California coast into the Pacific Ocean to form Bodega Bay. The narrow ridge of Bodega Head rests on the Pacific Plate, while but the nearby town itself is on the North American Plate. The fault can shift violently. During the 1906 San Francisco earthquake, land close to the Head moved as much as 15 feet. Tremors are frequent. In 1958, Joel Hedgpeth, director of the University of the Pacific Marine Station at Dillon Beach, began raising cautions regarding both earthquake safety and marine wildlife health that would be affected by warm water effluent. In 1958, when Gaffney was 66, PG&E proposed building a nuclear power plant on the tip of Bodega Head, virtually on top of the San Andreas Fault. Gaffney responded by inviting geologists, including Dr. Pierre St. Amand, who had studied the effects of the 1960 Valdivia earthquake in Chile, at 9.4-9.6 on the moment magnitude scale, the largest ever recorded. She also invited government inspectors to visit the land and observe the actual visible fault lines. St. Amand's report stated that he couldn't imagine a worse spot for a reactor.

Gaffney said that PG&E confided their plans to her, and it did not want the public to become aware of their intentions. Although, according to Gaffney, other property owners in the area sold to PG&E "without hesitation," she refused to sell to the utility. Intending rather to sell her property to the state or the University of California Gaffney sued the utility to keep her property from them and prevent the nuclear power plant construction. This drew national attention and helped to launch a grassroots environmental movement. Gaffney was successful. PG&E finally gave up on the project in 1964.

Gaffney had been forced to sell part of her property to PG&E, but sold the rest of it to the University of California and the California State Parks system for more, she said, than she was willing to take for it.

== Legacy ==
After the Bodega Bay Nuclear Power Plant proposal failed, the exploratory hole dug for the proposed plant filled with water. It has since been nicknamed "The Hole in the Head". Gaffney sold 90 acres of land to the California Beaches and Parks Department, and another 327 acres to the University of California, where the Bodega Marine Research Lab was established. Gaffney died in 1979. She was called the "Mother of Ecology" by the Los Angeles Times in 1971. Thomas Wellock proposes that the start of the anti-nuclear movement began with the dispute over Bodega Bay.

In 2003, Gaffney was the focus of a 30-minute documentary by Annette Arnold and Cathy Wild, called "Rose Gaffney: The Belle of Bodega Bay."
