= Rosalia (given name) =

Female given name

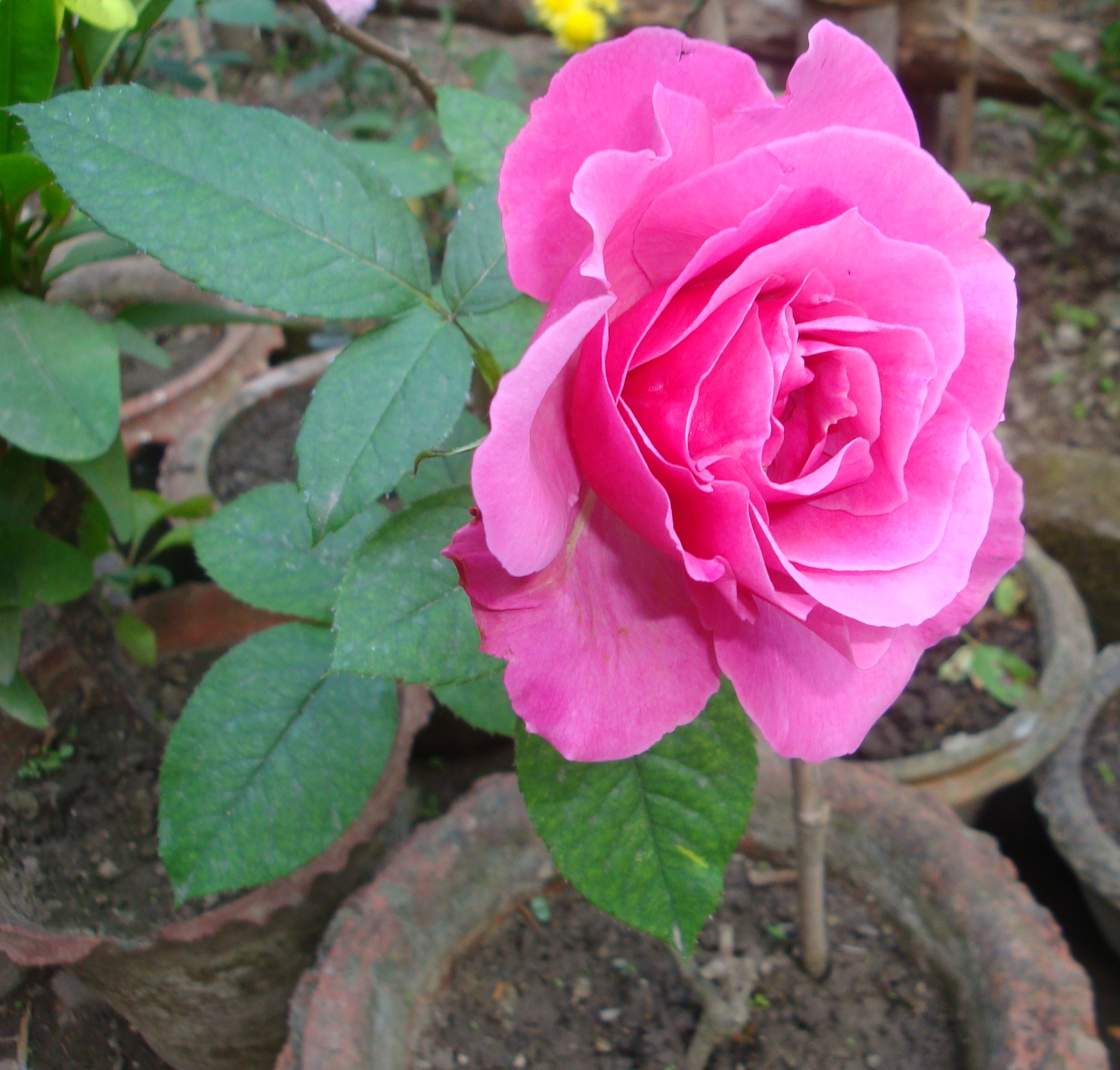
- A Rose
- Gender: Female

Origin
- Origin: Latin
- Meaning: "rose" or "rose festival"

Other names
- Related names: Rosa, Rosalie, Rosie, Rosalina

Rosalia is a feminine given name of Latin origin meaning "rose" and was the name of an early Saint Rosalia. In Latin, the Rosalia was a festival of roses celebrated variously throughout the Roman Empire.

== Variants ==
- Rosalia or Lia (Italian)
- Rosália (Portuguese)
- Rosalía (Galician and Spanish)
- Rosalia or Lia (Catalan, Indonesian)
- Rosalie (French)
- Rosaly, Rosalia or Rosalie (English)
- Rozália (Hungarian)
- Rozalia (Polish)
- Rozalija (Latvian, Lithuanian, Slovene and Croatian)
- Zala (Slovene)

== Notable people ==
- Rosalía Arteaga (born 1956), Ecuadorian politician
- Rosalia Lombardo (1918–1920), Italian child famous for her well-preserved mummy
- Rosalía Mera (1944–2013), Spanish billionaire businesswoman
- Rosalia Price (fl. 1790), British circus artist
- Rosalía de Castro (1837–1885), Spanish romanticist writer
- Rosalía (singer) (born 1992), Spanish singer
- Saint Rosalia, patron saint of Palermo in Italy
