= Ocampo Municipality, Tamaulipas =

Coordinates: 22°50′N 99°20′W

Ocampo
- Municipality
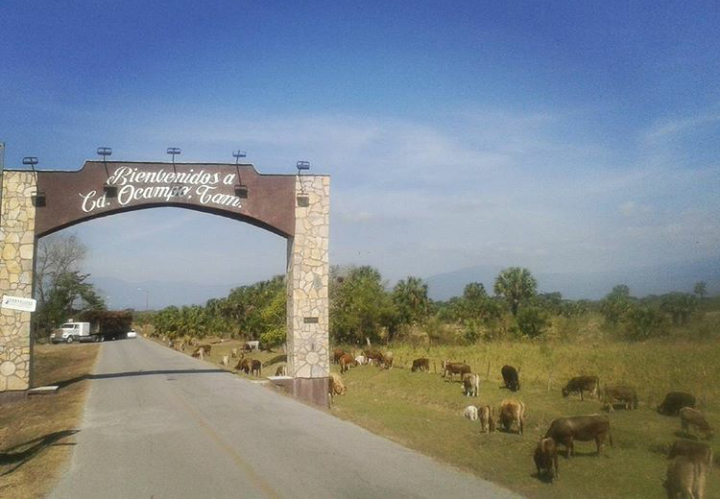

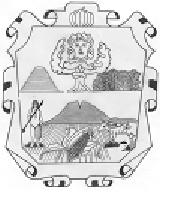
- Coat of arms

- Location in Mexico Ocampo (Mexico)
- Country: Mexico
- State: Tamaulipas
- Demonym: (in Spanish)
- Time zone: UTC−6 (CST)

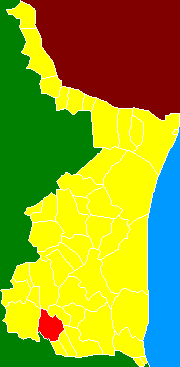
Location of the Ocampo municipality in the state of Tamaulipas

Ocampo is a municipality located in the Mexican state of Tamaulipas.

== See also ==
- Ocampo, Tamaulipas
- Municipalities of Tamaulipas
