= Rosette =

Rosette is the French diminutive of rose. It may refer to:

== Flower shaped designs ==
- Rosette (award), a mark awarded by an organisation
- Rosette (design), a small flower design
- Various flower-shaped or rotational symmetric forms:
  - Rosette (decoration), a small circular device that can be awarded with medal
  - Rosette (politics), worn by political candidates in an election
  - Rosette, a type of chain stitch in sewing
  - Rose window, a Gothic circular architectonic component cut most frequently in shape similar to a rose
  - Rosette (botany), a circular arrangement of leaves
  - Rosette (zoology), markings like those of a jaguar
  - A structure near the beak of some birds
  - Pliska rosette, an ancient bronze artifact found in Pliska, Bulgaria in 1961
  - Rosette sampler, a circular arrangement of Nansen bottles
  - A trophy attached on the head of a bull in the French course camarguaise bullfighting event
  - Klemperer rosette, a term used in interstellar cosmology and science fiction to indicate a group of cosmic bodies in a gravitational relationship
- ARRI rosette-type mount, mechanical connector used in film and video production
- Rosette (music), soundhole decoration on musical instruments

== Placename ==
- Rosetta, a.k.a. Rosetta or Rashid, a port city on the Mediterranean coast
- Rosette, Utah, an unincorporated ranching community in Box Elder County, US
- A site near Round Hill, Nova Scotia, Canada
- La Rosette, a settlement in Guadeloupe in the commune of Le Moule, on the island of Grande-Terre
- Sainte-Rosette, New Brunswick, an unincorporated community in Gloucester County, Canada

== People ==
=== Fictional characters ===
- Rosette Lambert in The Secret of Rosette Lambert, a 1920 French film by Raymond Bernard
- Rosette Christopher, the protagonist of the Chrono Crusade anime and manga series
- Princess Rosette, a French literary fairy tale written by Madame d'Aulnoy
- Rosette, in Manon, an opéra comique in five acts by Jules Massenet

=== Other people ===
- Rosette (actress) (real name Françoise Quéré, born 1959), a French actress
- La Belle Rosette, real name Beryl McBurnie (1915–2000), a Trinidadian dance legend
- Rosette Bir (1926–1992), French sculptor
- Rosette Anday
- Rosette Sharma (born 1982), Canadian singer, songwriter and actress
- Clinton Rosette (1850–1909), prominent citizen of DeKalb, Illinois

== Food ==
- Rosette (grape), a wine grape variety
  - Rufete (grape), a Portuguese/Spanish wine grape variety also known as Rosette
- Rosette (cookie), a thin crispy moulded cookie apparently of Scandinavian origin
- Rosette, a white Bergerac wine
- Rosette (cake), a decoration made by cream or frosting, with a piping tip. "a food decoration or garnish in the shape of a rose"
- Rosette de Lyon, a French pork saucisson or sausage
- A dish from Emalia-Romagna consisting of a pasta filled with bechamel, cream, ham and others; see List of Italian dishes#Emilia-Romagna
- A kind of bread from Italian province of Veneto

== Music ==
- Rosette (album), an album by Japanese singer Shizuka Kudō

== Scientific names which include the element "rosette" ==
- A point group in geometry, also known as a rosette group
- Rosette Nebula, a nebula in the constellation Monoceros
- Rosette sampler, a device used to assess water quality
- Gypsum rosette, an alternative name for a desert rose (crystal)
- Klemperer rosette, a symmetrical arrangement of orbiting bodies arranged around a common center of mass
- The Rosette terminal complex, a structure in vascular plants that produces cellulose
- Erythrocyte rosetting, formation of red blood cells arranging themselves around a central cell so that the entire cluster looks more or less like a flower
- Rosette or palisade (pathology) of cells in a halo or spoken-wheel arrangement
- Furstenberg's rosette, an anatomical structure in the internal streak canal of the teat
- Mossy fiber (cerebellum), sometimes called a mossy fiber rosette
- The anterior olfactory nucleus of fishes can be called the olfactory rosette
- A rosette agent is Sphaerothecum destruens, a protist parasite of fish
- Rosette (schizont appearance), a formation characteristic of schizonts in protozoal infections by the reptile parasites Plasmodium tropiduri and P. holaspi or fish parasite Babesiosoma
- Groundnut rosette virus, a plant pathogenic virus
- Peach rosette mosaic virus, a plant pathogenic virus
- Rose rosette disease, a disease of the rose caused by a phytoplasm; see list of pests and diseases of roses
- CD2, a protein also known as rosette receptor

== Similar spellings ==
- Claudia Rosett, an American writer and journalist
- Rosete (disambiguation)
- Roset (disambiguation)
- Rozet (disambiguation)
- Rozetes, symbols of the Eleusinian cult visible at the Archaeological Museum of Eleusis, Greece
- Roxette, a Swedish pop duo

== See also ==
- Rosetta (disambiguation)
- Rosetti (disambiguation), a disambiguation page
- Rose (disambiguation)
- Compass rose, a graphic device indicating directions on a map, primarily North
- The White Rosette, a 1916 American silent short romantic film directed by Tom Ricketts
