= Olton High School =

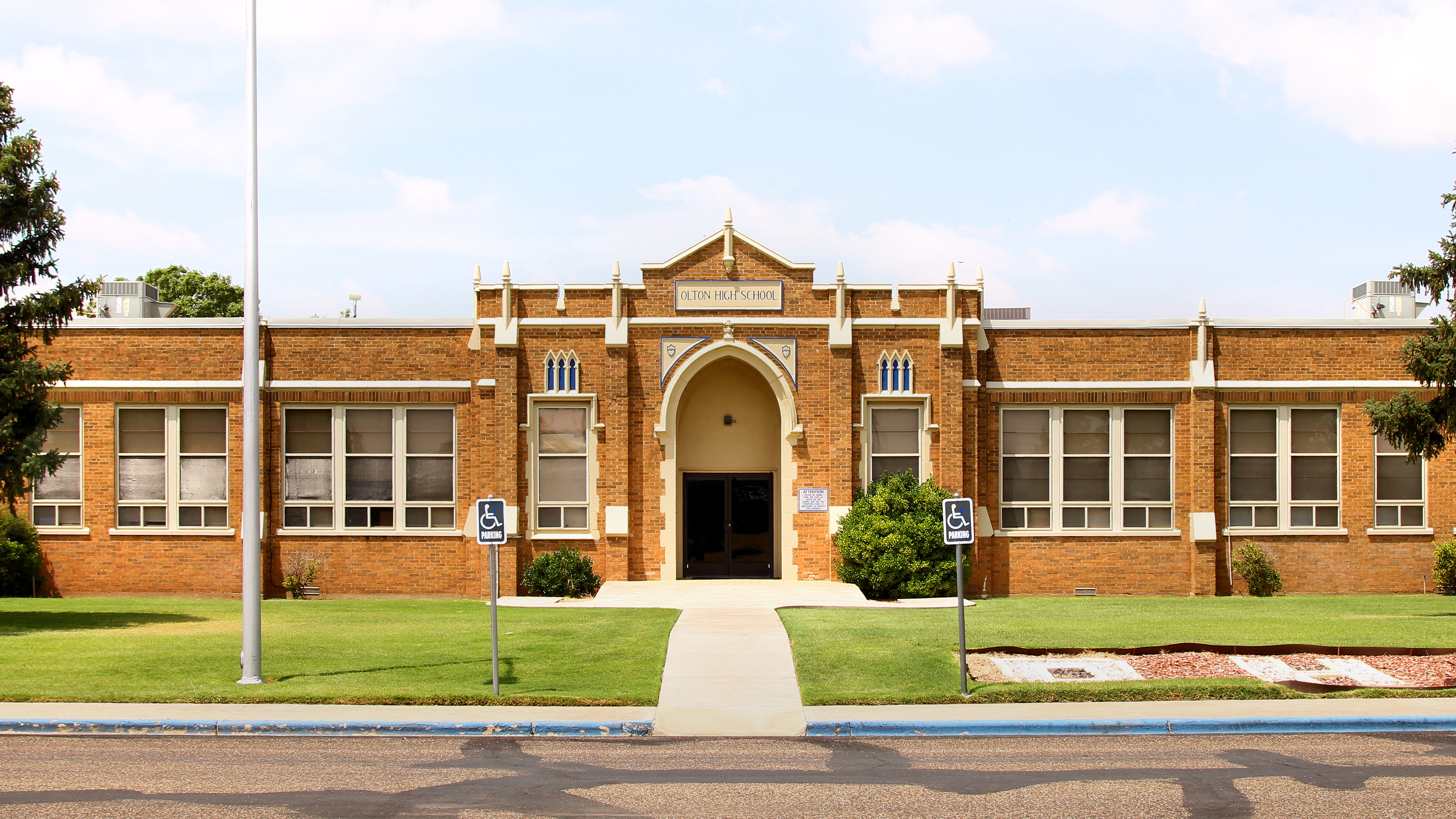

Location
- 7th & Avenue G Olton, Texas 79064; United States; 34.181619°N 102.136892°W

Information
- School type: Public high school
- School district: Olton Independent School District
- Principal: Colby Huseman
- Teaching staff: 20.70 (FTE)
- Grades: 9-12
- Enrollment: 201 (2023-2024)
- Student to teacher ratio: 9.71
- Colors: Blue and White
- Athletics conference: UIL Class AA
- Mascot: Lightning The Mustang
- Yearbook: Mustang
- Website: Olton High School

Olton High School is a public high school located in the city of Olton, Texas, USA and classified as a 2A school by the UIL. It is a part of the Olton Independent School District located in eastern Lamb County. In 2015, the school was rated "Met Standard" by the Texas Education Agency.

== Athletics ==
The Olton Mustangs compete in these sports

- Baseball
- Basketball
- Cross Country
- Football
- Golf
- Powerlifting
- Tennis
- Track and Field
- Volleyball
- Softball

=== State titles ===
- Girls Track -
  - 1975(2A)
- Tennis
  - 2016 Boys Singles State Champion Runner Up Bobby Marshall
  - 2017 Boys Singles State Champion Bobby Marshall
  - 2017 Girls Doubles State Championship 3rd Place Kea Sandoval & Soledad Pedroza
  - 2018 Girls Singles State Championship 3rd Place Kea Sandoval

== Notable alumni ==
- Bob Bryant (June 14, 1918 – November 3, 2000) was an American football tackle who played four seasons with the San Francisco 49ers of the All-America Football Conference and Calgary Stampeders of the Canadian Football League.
