= Roset =

Roset may refer to:

== Business ==
- Ligne Roset, a French modern furniture company

== Places ==
- Roset-Fluans, a commune in the Doubs department, France
- Ogașu lui Roșeț, a tributary of the Cerna River in Romania
- Roset, Vestland, a village in Stryn municipality, Vestland county, Norway

== See also ==
- Rosette (disambiguation)
- Rozet (disambiguation)
