= J. Frank Norfleet =

American rancher and manhunter (1865–1967)

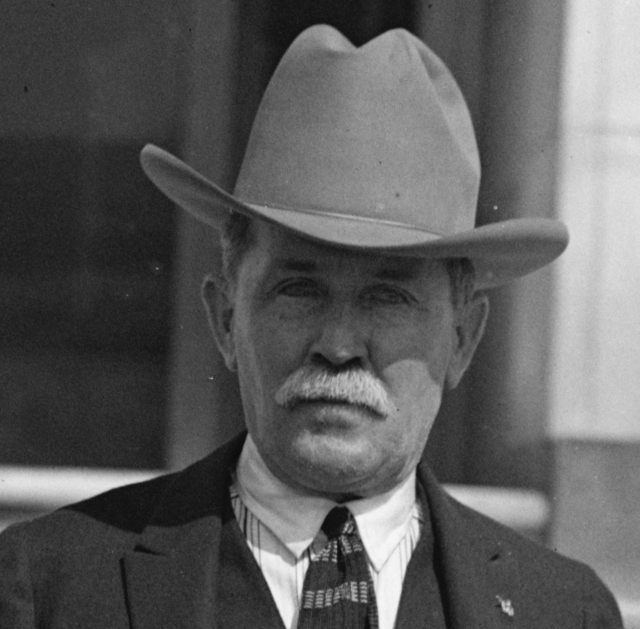
- Norfleet in 1924
- Born: James Franklin Norfleet; February 23, 1865; Lampasas County, Texas, US
- Died: October 15, 1967 (aged 102)
- Burial place: Lubbock Resthaven Mausoleum, Lubbock, Texas, US
- Other name: "Little Tiger"
- Occupations: Rancher, manhunter
- Height: 5 ft 5 in (165 cm)
- Children: 4

James Franklin Norfleet (February 23, 1865 — October 15, 1967) was an American rancher who was responsible for the capture and arrest of over 100 criminals during the early 20th century.

== Biography ==
=== Early life and ranching ===
Norfleet was born on February 23, 1865, in Lampasas County, Texas, to Jasper Holmes Benton, a Texas Ranger, and Mary Ann "Shaw" Norfleet. In 1870, the family moved to Williamson County to begin ranching. In 1879, he joined in a buffalo hunt in the Llano Estacado. Afterwards, he worked as a cowboy.

In 1886, John and Dudley Snyder hired Norfleet to drive 5,000 cattle from San Saba to a field west of Littlefield. He worked for the Snyder brothers until 1889, when Isaac L. Ellwood hired him as a foreman for Spade Ranch. On June 23, 1894, he married Mattie Eliza Hudgins, and they had 4 children together: Mary, Robert Lee, Frank Ellwood, and Ruth Elise. His family moved to Spade, Texas, and by 1905, he owned 20,000 acres of land.

=== Manhunting and later years ===
In 1919, Norfleet went to Dallas to try to sell his property to buy land from Christopher Columbus Slaughter. He lost around US$75,000 (~ $1.3 million in 2024) to five conmen: Joe Furey, E. J. Ward, W. B. Spencer, Charles Gerber, and Reno Hamlin.

To get his money back, he went on a 30,000-mile long independent manhunt to capture the conmen. He followed Joe Furey from California to Florida, ending in a fight in a café and Norfleet bringing him back to Fort Worth. He followed W. B. Spencer to Canada, but lost a fight allowing Spencer to escape. Spencer ended up in a Utah prison. He captured three more men in Los Angeles, two more in Salt Lake City, and one in Georgia. He was nicknamed "Little Tiger" for being feared despite his short stature of 5 ft 5 in (165 cm).

Between 1919 and 1935, Norfleet was responsible for the capture and arrest of over 100 criminals, including Lou Blonger in Summer 1922. He celebrated his 100th birthday in 1965, and died on October 15, 1967, at the age of 102. He is buried at the Lubbock Resthaven Mausoleum in Lubbock, Texas.
