= Rossetti =

Rossetti may refer to:

- Biagio Rossetti (c. 1447–1516), architect and urbanist from Ferrara, the first to use modern methods
- Carlo Rossetti (1614–1681), Italian cardinal, nobleman
- Cezaro Rossetti (1901–1950), Scottish Esperanto writer
- Francesco Rossetti (1833–1885), Italian physicist
- Gabriele Rossetti (1783–1854), poet, scholar and Italian émigré to England, father of Dante Gabriel, Christina Georgina, William Michael, and Maria Francesca
  - Dante Gabriel Rossetti (1828–1882), English poet, illustrator, painter and translator, founder member of the Pre-Raphaelite Brotherhood
  - Christina Georgina Rossetti (1830–1894), English poet
  - Maria Francesca Rossetti (1827–1876), English author
  - William Michael Rossetti (1829–1919), English writer and critic, founder member of the Pre-Raphaelite Brotherhood
- Gino Rossetti (former name Rosetti, 1904–1992), Italian football player
- Giuseppina Rossetti, mother of Lorenzo Respighi (1824–1889), Italian mathematician and natural philosopher
- Mario J. Rossetti (1935–2014), American jurist
- Raffaele Rossetti (1881–1951), Italian engineer and military naval officer who sank the main battleship of the Austro-Hungarian Empire at the end of World War I. Politician of the Italian Republican Party.
- Reto Rossetti (1909–1994), British-based, officially Italian-Swiss poet and Esperantist professor, brother of Cezaro
- Sergio Rossetti Morosini (born 1953), New York author, painter, sculptor and independent filmmaker
- Stefano Rossetti or Rossetto (fl. 1560–1580), Italian composer to the Medici
- Stephen Joseph Rossetti (born 1951), American Roman Catholic priest, author, lecturer and psychologist
- Rossetti Architects, a Detroit architectural design firm

== See also ==
- Rosseti, a Russian power company
- Rosetti (disambiguation)
- Rosette (disambiguation)
- Rosetti family, a Moldavian princely family
