= Rosas (surname) =

Rosas is a Spanish surname, derived from the Latin word rosa (rose.) The earliest records of the name trace its appearance back to Northern Spain, in the mountains of Cantabria. It is possible that originally the Rosas family lived in or came from an area where wild roses grew.

Spelling variations of this surname include, but are not limited to: Ros, de Ros, de Rosas, Rosa, de la Rosa, Rosal, del Rosal, Rosales, Rosanes, Rozanes, de Rosales, Rosete, Rosano, Rosana, Roso, and Rozas.

Notable people with this surname include:

- Aldrick Rosas (born 1994), NFL placekicker
- Cesar Rosas (born 1954), Mexican musician
- Fernando Rosas (born 1946), Portuguese academic and politician
- Hélio Rosas (1929–2022), Brazilian politician
- Jesús Rosas Marcano (1930–2001), Venezuelan educator, journalist, poet and composer
- Juan Manuel de Rosas (1793–1877), Argentine governor
- Juventino Rosas (1868–1894), Mexican musician, violinist, and band leader
- Raul Rosas Jr. (born 2004), UFC fighter
- Soledad Rosas (1974–1998), Argentine anarchist

Rozas

- Ángel Rozas (born 1950), Argentine governor
- Juan Martínez de Rozas (1758–1814), politician of the Chilean war of independence
