= Cociu =

Cociu may refer to several villages in Romania:

- Cociu, a village in Motoșeni Commune, Bacău County
- Cociu, a village in Șintereag Commune, Bistrița-Năsăud County
- Cociu Waterfall, the highest waterfall of Romania
