= Bob Bryant (tackle) =

American football player (1918–2000)

- Bryant in 1949

No. 17, 52, 16, 42
- Position: Tackle

Personal information
- Born: June 14, 1918; Frederick, Oklahoma, U.S.
- Died: November 3, 2000 (aged 82); Oklahoma City, Oklahoma, U.S.
- Listed height: 6 ft 3 in (1.91 m)
- Listed weight: 226 lb (103 kg)

Career information
- High school: Olton (TX)
- College: Texas Tech (1937–1939); Santa Ana JC (1940)

Career history
- Steagles (1943)*; Hollywood Rangers (1944); Los Angeles Bulldogs (1945); San Francisco 49ers (1946–1949); Calgary Stampeders (1952–1953)
- * Offseason or practice squad member only
- Stats at Pro Football Reference

Robert Russell Bryant (June 14, 1918 – November 3, 2000) was an American professional football tackle who played four seasons with the San Francisco 49ers of the All-America Football Conference (AAFC).

== Early life and college ==
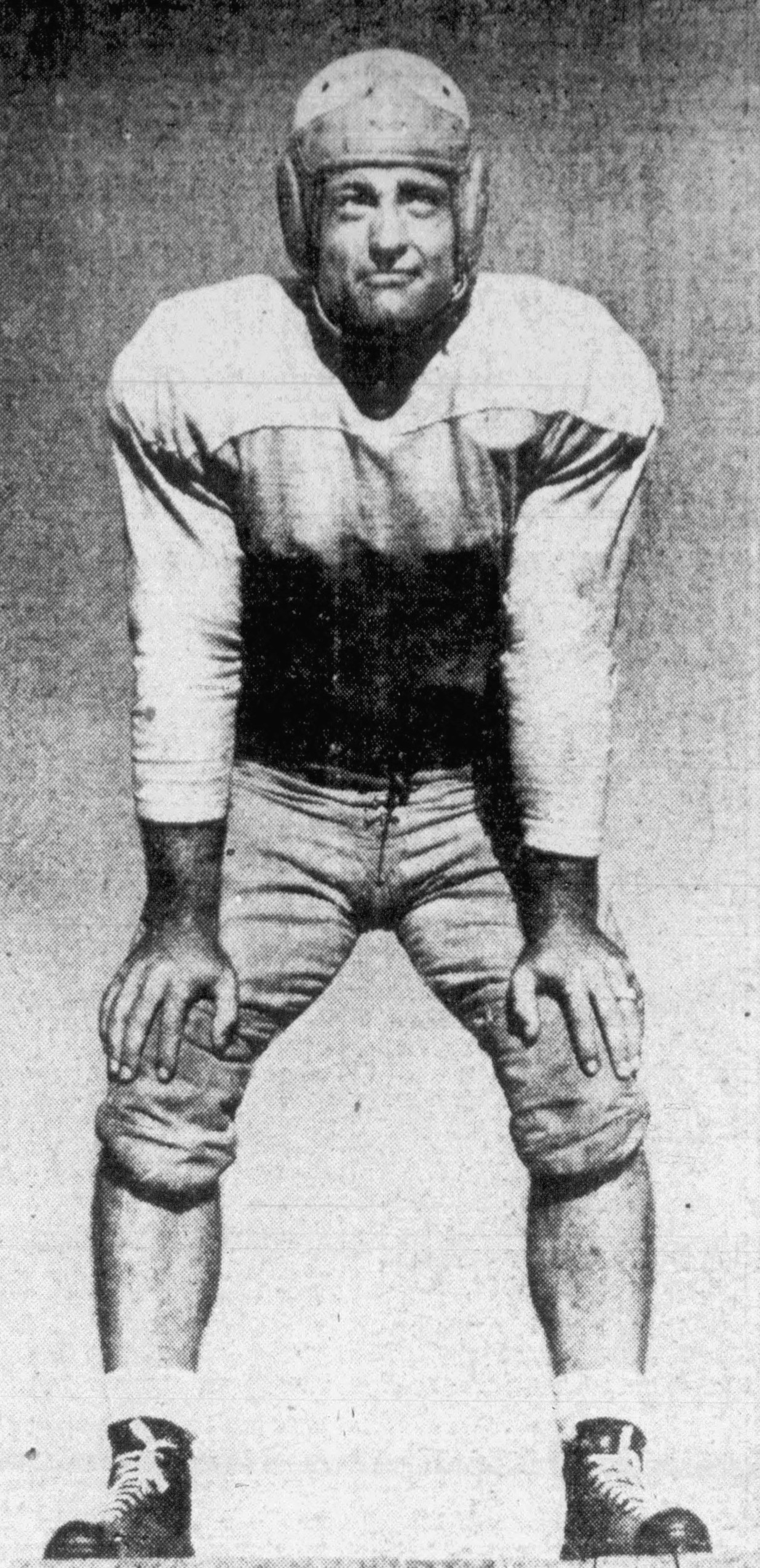
Bryant as a member of the Hollywood Rangers in 1944.

Robert Russell Bryant was born on June 14, 1918 in Frederick, Oklahoma. He attended Olton High School in Olton, Texas.

Bryant was a member of the Texas Tech Red Raiders football team from 1937 to 1939. He was on the freshman team in 1937 and listed as ineligible in 1939. He played at Santa Ana Junior College in 1940. His football career was interrupted by a stint in the United States Army during World War II.

== Professional career ==
Bryant signed with the Steagles of the National Football League in 1943 but was later released. He started four games for the Hollywood Rangers of the American Football League in 1944. He was a member of the Los Angeles Bulldogs of the Pacific Coast Professional Football League in 1945.

Bryant signed with the San Francisco 49ers of the All-America Football Conference (AAFC) on January 25, 1946. He played in 14 games, starting three, for the 49ers during the team's inaugural season in 1946. He then started all 14 games for the 49ers in both 1947 and 1948. He appeared in five games, all starts, in 1949, the final season of the AAFC.

Bryant played in 12 games for the Calgary Stampeders of the Western Interprovincial Football Union in 1952. He appeared in 14 games for them the following season.

== Personal life ==
Bryant died on November 3, 2000, in Oklahoma City, Oklahoma.
