= Rosetta (disambiguation) =

Rosetta is a city in Egypt.

Rosetta may also refer to:

== Places ==
- Rosetta, Belfast, a ward in Northern Ireland
- Rosetta, Tasmania, a suburb of Hobart, Tasmania, Australia
- Rosetta, KwaZulu-Natal, a town in South Africa

== Science and technology ==
- Rosetta (spacecraft), a European Space Agency-led spacecraft launched in 2004 to study comet 67P/Churyumov-Gerasimenko
- Rosetta orbit, a complex type of orbit in mathematics
- Rosetta (software), a series of binary translators developed by Apple Inc.
- Ex Libris Rosetta, digital repository software from the Ex Libris Group
- Rosetta-lang, a system-level specification language
- Rosetta Biosoftware, a subsidiary of Merck & Co.
- Rosetta Genomics, a molecular diagnostics company
- Rosetta@home, a freeware program available to help predict and design protein structures
- ROSETTA, biomolecular modeling and design software; see CS-ROSETTA
- Rosetta, a web-based translation application written by Canonical Ltd. for use on the Linux distribution Ubuntu operating system
- Rosetta, the Apple Newton's handwriting recognition system
- Rosetta, the Microsoft codename of SQL Server Reporting Services
- Rosetta Code, a wiki-based programming chrestomathy website
- Rosetta Digital Audio converters, manufactured by Apogee Electronics

== Entertainment ==
- Rosetta (band), an American post-metal band formed in 2003
- Rosetta (film), a 1999 Belgian film
- Rosetta (novel), a Star Trek: Enterprise novel
- Rosetta: The Masked Angel (Kamen Tenshi Rosetta), a Japanese toku series that aired in 1998
- "Rosetta", a jazz tune written by Earl Hines and Henri Woode
- Rosetta, a form of latte art which resembles a flower
- Rosetta, a character in the Disney Fairies franchise
- Rosetta, the Japanese name of Rosalina, a character in the Mario franchise
- Rosetta Passel, a character in Kaleido Star anime series
- "Rosetta", a 1971 UK hit single by Alan Price and Georgie Fame
- Angelo Rosetta, a fictional character from the Australian soap opera Home and Away
- "Rosetta", a Season Two episode of Smallville
- Rosetta (album), 2016 studio album by Vangelis
- Rosetta, a series of graphic novel anthologies released by Alternative Comics
- "Rosetta", a song by Don Patterson with Booker Ervin from Hip Cake Walk

== People with the surname ==
- Virginio Rosetta (1902–1975), Italian football player

== Other uses ==
- Rosetta (given name), a given name (including a list of people with the name)
- Rosetta (bread), an Italian bread
- Rosetta (restaurant), a restaurant in Mexico City
- Nebbiolo, an Italian wine grape also known as Rosetta

== See also ==
- HD-Rosetta, a permanent data storage device
- Hippotion rosetta, a moth species found in Asia
- Rosetta Head and Harbour, in South Australia
- Rosetta Project, a global collaboration which collects and archives languages in danger of extinction
- Rosetta Stone, an inscribed stone which led to the modern translation of Egyptian hieroglyphs
- Rosetta Stone (disambiguation)
- Rossetta (disambiguation)
- Rosette (disambiguation)
