= Rosales (disambiguation) =

Rosales is an order of flowering plants.

Rosales may also refer to:

== People ==
- Rosales (surname)

== Places ==
- Coronel Rosales Partido, a partido of the province of Buenos Aires
- Vicente Pérez Rosales National Park
- Rosales (Bogotá), a neighbourhood in Bogotá
- Culiacán Rosales, capital of the state of Sinaloa
- Rosales Municipality, a municipality in the state of Chihuahua
- Santa Cruz de Rosales, a town in the state of Chihuahua
- Calera de Víctor Rosales, a municipality in the state of Zacatecas
- Rosales, Pangasinan, a municipality in the province of Pangasinan

== Others ==
- ARA Rosales (P-42), an Argentine Navy ship
- Battle of Santa Cruz de Rosales, of the Mexican–American War

== See also ==
- Los Rosales (disambiguation)
