= Alcida and Dauversière =

Coordinates: 47.770583°N 65.829056°W

Location of Alcida and Dauversière in New Brunswick

Alcida and Dauversière was an area with enhanced services within the former Canadian local service district of the parish of Beresford in Gloucester County, New Brunswick; it was often erroneously cited as a local service district in its own right. There were about 100 inhabitants; the area is well known for its beautiful Antinouri Lake. The church is now destroyed with the graveyard still intact and the community centre is being restored.

== See also ==
- List of communities in New Brunswick
