= John and Dudley Snyder =

American cattle drover and rancher brothers

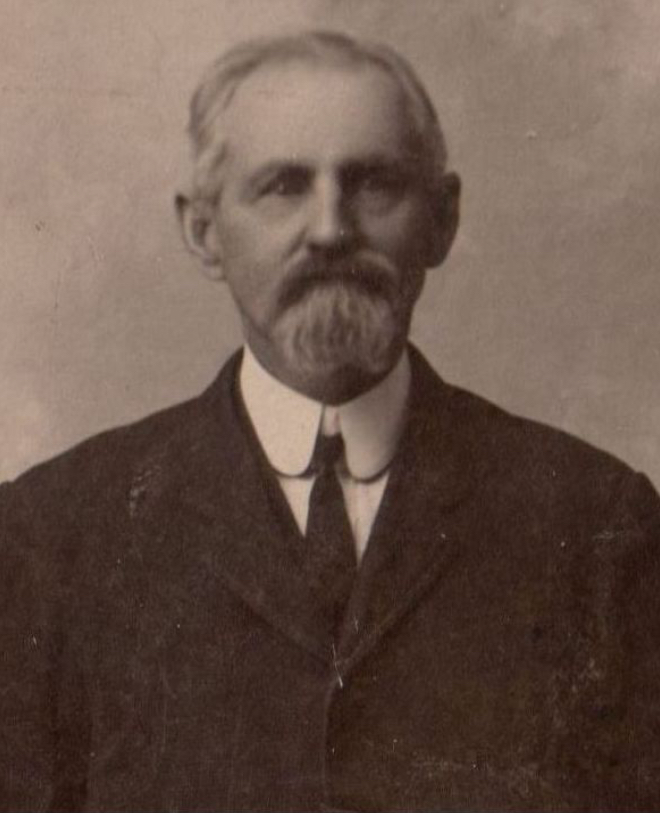
John Welsey Snyder

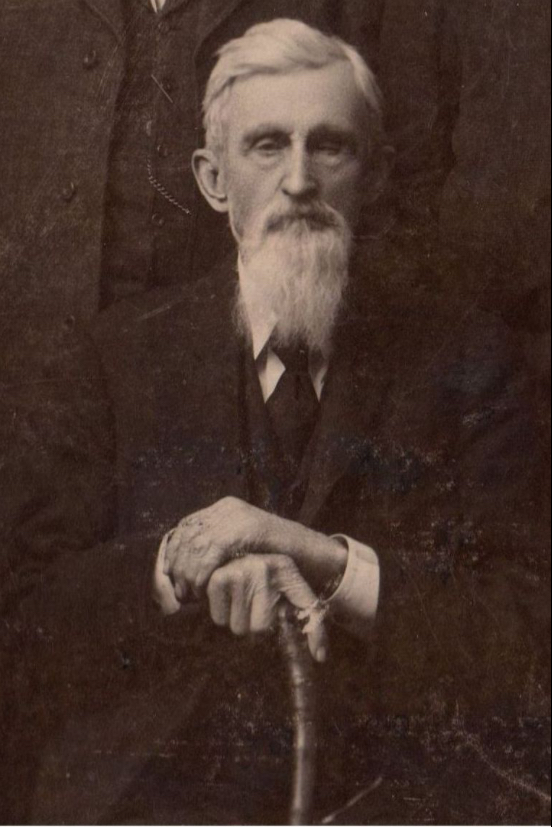
Dudley Hiram Snyder

Dudley Hiram Snyder (1833 – 1921) and John Wesley Snyder (21 June, 1837 — April 14, 1922) were American cattle drover and rancher brothers.

== Biographies ==
Dudley was born in Mississippi in 1833, while John was born the second of four children in Yazoo County, Mississippi, on June 21, 1837, to Charles W. Snyder and Susan Hale. After their father's death in 1840, the family moved to Missouri. In fall 1856, John and Dudley moved to Round Rock, Texas, where they founded a farm.

During the American Civil War, John enlisted in the Confederate States Army, while Dudley got a contract to transport and sell cattle to the Trans-Mississippi Department, also serving as a conscription officer for Williamson County.

After the war, John moved cotton to South Texas to remake money the family lost during the war, while Dudley drove cattle to the High Plains region, being the first to drove cattle from Texas to Wyoming. He gave most of his money to support Southwestern University.

During the January 1886 blizzard, John hired J. Frank Norfleet to do his cattle droving, and also sold the ~130,000 acres of land he owned with Dudley to Isaac L. Ellwood, who developed the land into Spade Ranch. After 1891, the brothers worked as horse traders. In 1900, Dudley was elected judge of Sherman County, beating William B. Slaughter by 4 votes. John married Catherine Jane Coffee, daughter of John T. Coffee, having 8 children with her. He died on April 14, 1922. Dudley married Mary Oatts, having 9 children with her. He died in his home in Georgetown in 1921.
