= Spade Independent School District =

School district in Texas

Spade Independent School District was a public school district based in the community of Spade, Texas (USA).

The district had one school, Spade School, that served students in grades pre-kindergarten through twelve.

== History ==
On July 1, 2006, Spade ISD merged with Olton Independent School District to form Olton ISD .
