= Spade Ranch (Texas) =

Two ranches in Texas, US

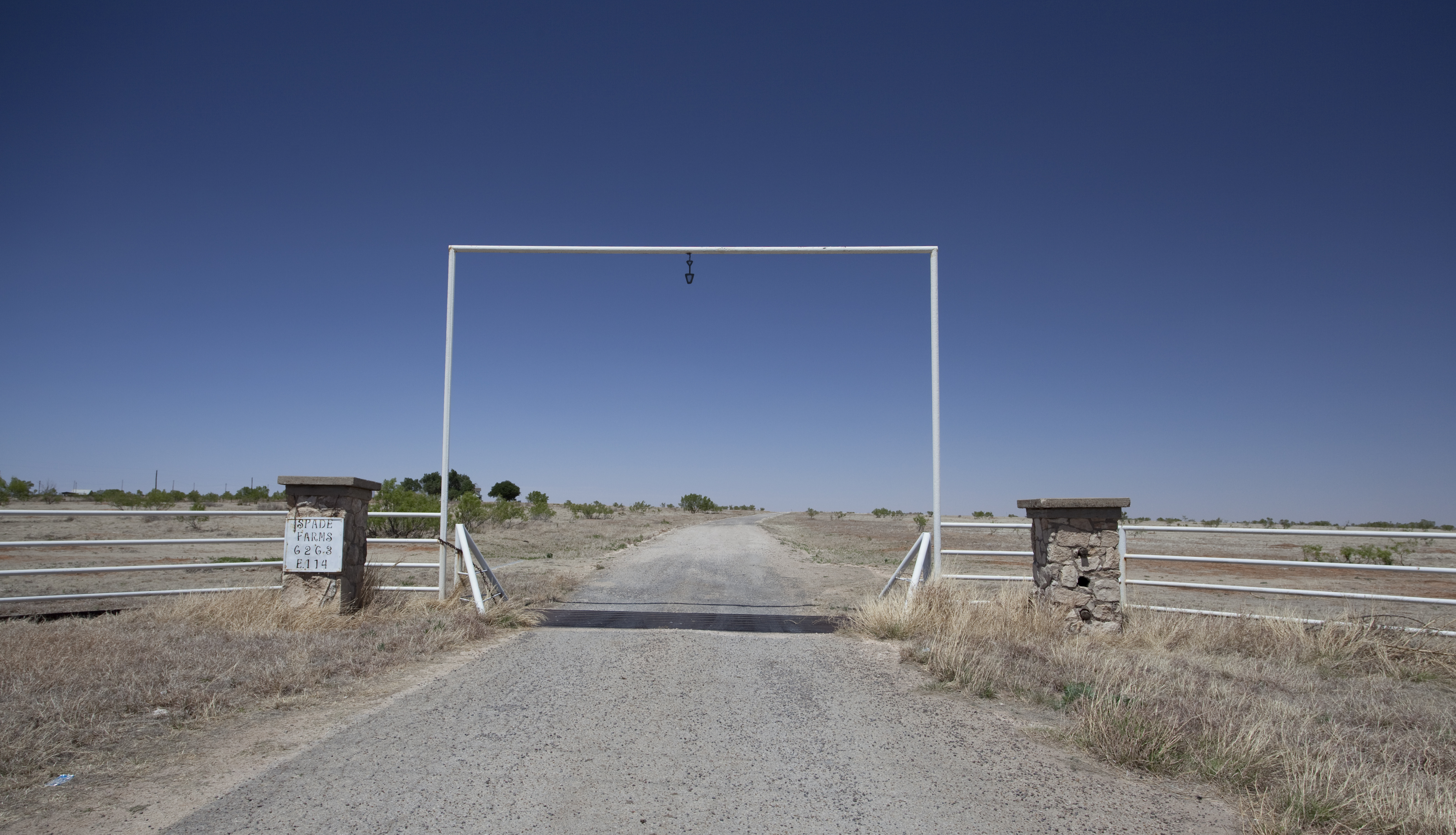
- The entrance to the original Spade Ranch headquarters in Hockley County, 2011
- Type: Ranch
- Location: Texas

History
- Founded: 1886
- Founder: Isaac L. Ellwood

Spade Ranch was the name of two separate West Texas ranches under separate ownership, before being combined by Isaac L. Ellwood. Both ranches are known for their use of barbed wire.

== History ==
The first ranch, in the Texas panhandle, was started by John F. "Spade" Evans on August 25, 1880, after Evans purchased 23 pieces of land in Donley County.

The second ranch, headquartered in Mitchell County, was started as the Renderbrook Ranch by J. Taylor Barr. In 1882, John and Dudley Snyder bought the ranch and by 1887, enlarged the ranch to 300,000 acres. During the January 1886 blizzard, the Snyder brothers sold the land to Isaac L. Ellwood. He combined the first Spade ranch with Renderbrook, and after buying 128,000 more acres from the Snyder brothers, renamed the land to Spade ranch. He had the Spade ranch brand registered in 1889. That same year, J. Frank Norfleet became the first foreman of the ranch.

After Ellwood's death on September 11, 1910, the ranch was inherited by sons William Leonard and Erwin Perry Ellwood. They placed barbed wire across the land, and replaced the cattle with Herefords in 1919, as they are better suited to the dry climate of Texas. In 1924, the northern part of the land put on sale, selling 6,300 cattle that October. 5,200 were later sold, and by 1926, about 80% of the northern part of the land had been sold.

Spade, Texas is named after Spade Ranch.
