= Rozet =

Rozet may refer to:

- Rozet, Wyoming, an unincorporated community in Campbell County, Wyoming, United States
- Rozet-Saint-Albin, a commune in the Aisne department in Picardie in northern France
- François Rozet (1899–1994), a French Canadian actor
- Fanny Rozet (1881–1958), French sculptor
- René Rozet (1858–1939), French sculptor

== See also ==
- Roset, a disambiguation page
- Rosette, a disambiguation page
