= Nicholas-Denys =

Nicholas Denys
- Unincorporated community
- Location within New Brunswick.
- Coordinates: 47.698055°N 65.88555°W
- Country: Canada
- Province: New Brunswick
- County: Gloucester
- Parish: Beresford
- Electoral Districts Federal: Acadie—Bathurst
- Provincial: Restigouche-Chaleur

Government
  - Type: Local service district
- Time zone: UTC-4 (AST)
  - Summer (DST): UTC-3 (ADT)
- Postal code(s): E8K
- Area code: 506
- Highways: None

Nicholas Denys is an unincorporated community in Gloucester County, New Brunswick, Canada.

Commemorates the career of Nicolas Denys (1598-1688), one of the leading figures in seventeenth-century Acadia. In 1654 he was appointed governor of the "coasts and islands of the Gulf of St. Laurence from Canso to Gaspe". Died probably at Nepisiguit, in 1688. Post office from 1940 to 1970.

== See also ==
- List of communities in New Brunswick
