= C. A. Rosetti (disambiguation) =

C. A. Rosetti may refer to:

- Constantin Alexandru Rosetti, a Romanian revolutionary
- C. A. Rosetti, a commune in Buzău County, Romania
- C. A. Rosetti, a commune in Tulcea County, Romania

== See also ==
- Rosetti (disambiguation)
