= Los Rosales =

Los Rosales may refer to the following places in Spain:

- Los Rosales (Madrid), a ward of Madrid
- Los Rosales (Málaga), a ward of Churriana, Málaga
- Los Rosales (Seville), a locality in Tocina, Seville
- Los Rosales, an area in Albacete, Castilla–La Mancha

== See also ==
- Rosales (disambiguation)
