= Rossetta =

Rossetta may refer to:

- a synonym for the Italian wine grape variety Rossignola
- a frazione of Bagnacavallo, Italy
- a place in the Mpofana Local Municipality, South Africa

== See also ==
- Rosetta (disambiguation)
