= Murfatlar Cave Complex =

Medieval Christian monastery in Romania

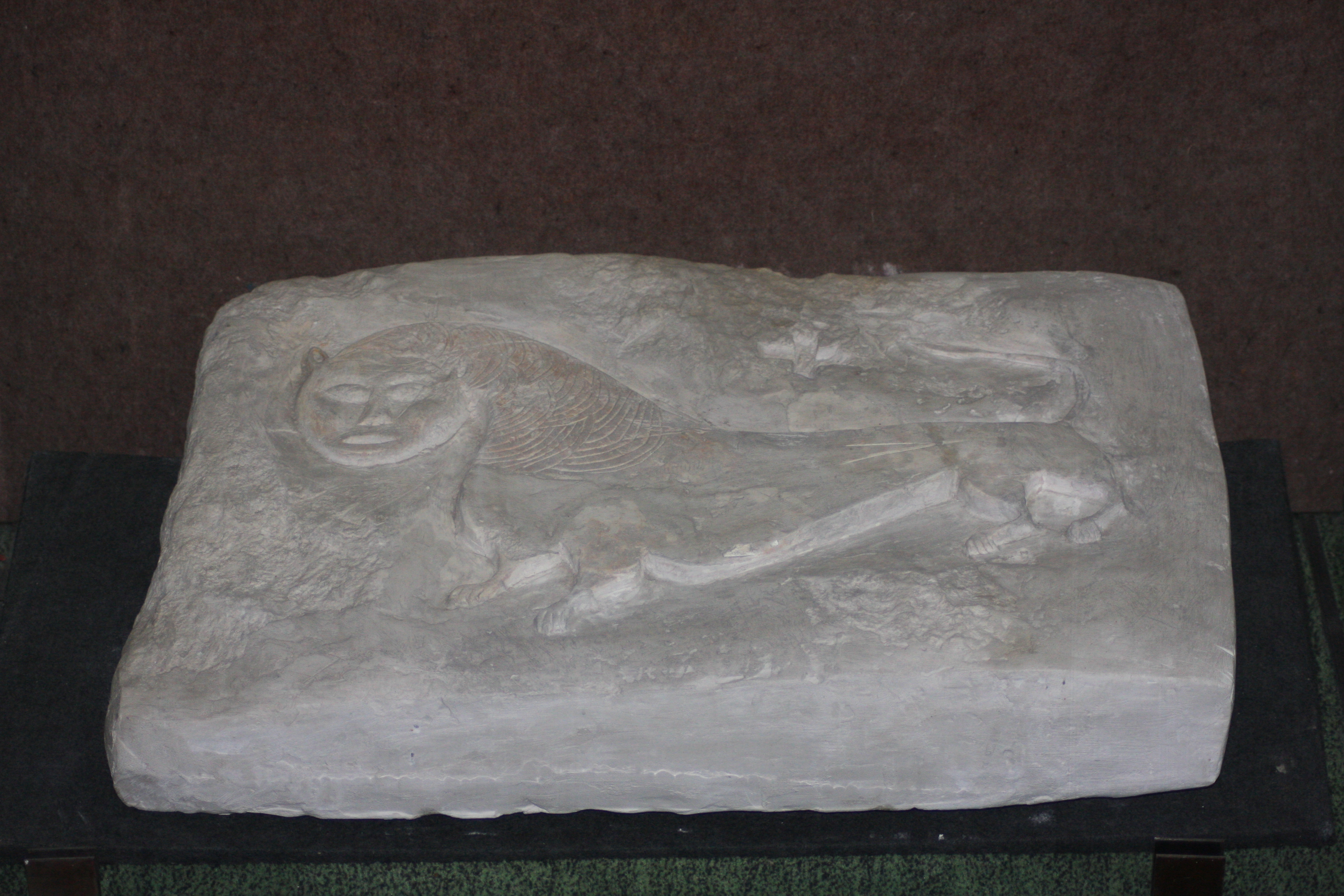
Murfatlar murals displayed in Constanța Museum

The Basarabi-Murfatlar Cave Complex is a medieval Christian monastery near the town of Murfatlar (known as Basarabi between 1924–1965 and 1975–2007), Constanța County, Northern Dobruja, Romania. The complex is a relict from a widespread monastic phenomenon in 10th century Bulgaria.

== History ==
The rock churches of Murflatlar, carved into a chalk hill, were discovered in 1957. The excavations conducted in 1957–1960 uncovered a complex of cells-dwellings, 4 small and 2 larger churches, crypts and tombs, all dating from the 9th – 11th century. From the late 7th until beginning of the 11th century this territory was part of the First Bulgarian Empire.

== Inscriptions ==
There are many inscriptions engraved on the walls – 2 in the Greek alphabet, 2 in the Old Slavonic language (Bulgarian recension) using the Glagolitic script and over 30 using the Cyrillic script. The most numerous are the runic inscriptions of Turkic type – over 60 have been found so far. The same type of runes have been used on the Pliska Rosette and can be found on building materials and on the 9th century walls of the first Bulgarian capital Pliska. The Turkic runes in Murfatlar were based probably on the Kharosthi script. The language of the runes is presumably Bulgar. According to Romanian researchers, some graffiti, were interpreted as Varangian. However, they could have been carved by the local monks during the Rus' invasion of Bulgaria. Despite many attempts at cracking the Murfatlar script, there still is not a universally accepted decipherment, and it is rather heterogeneous. Nevertheless, it is most likely that local monks drew their inspiration here.

== Image gallery ==
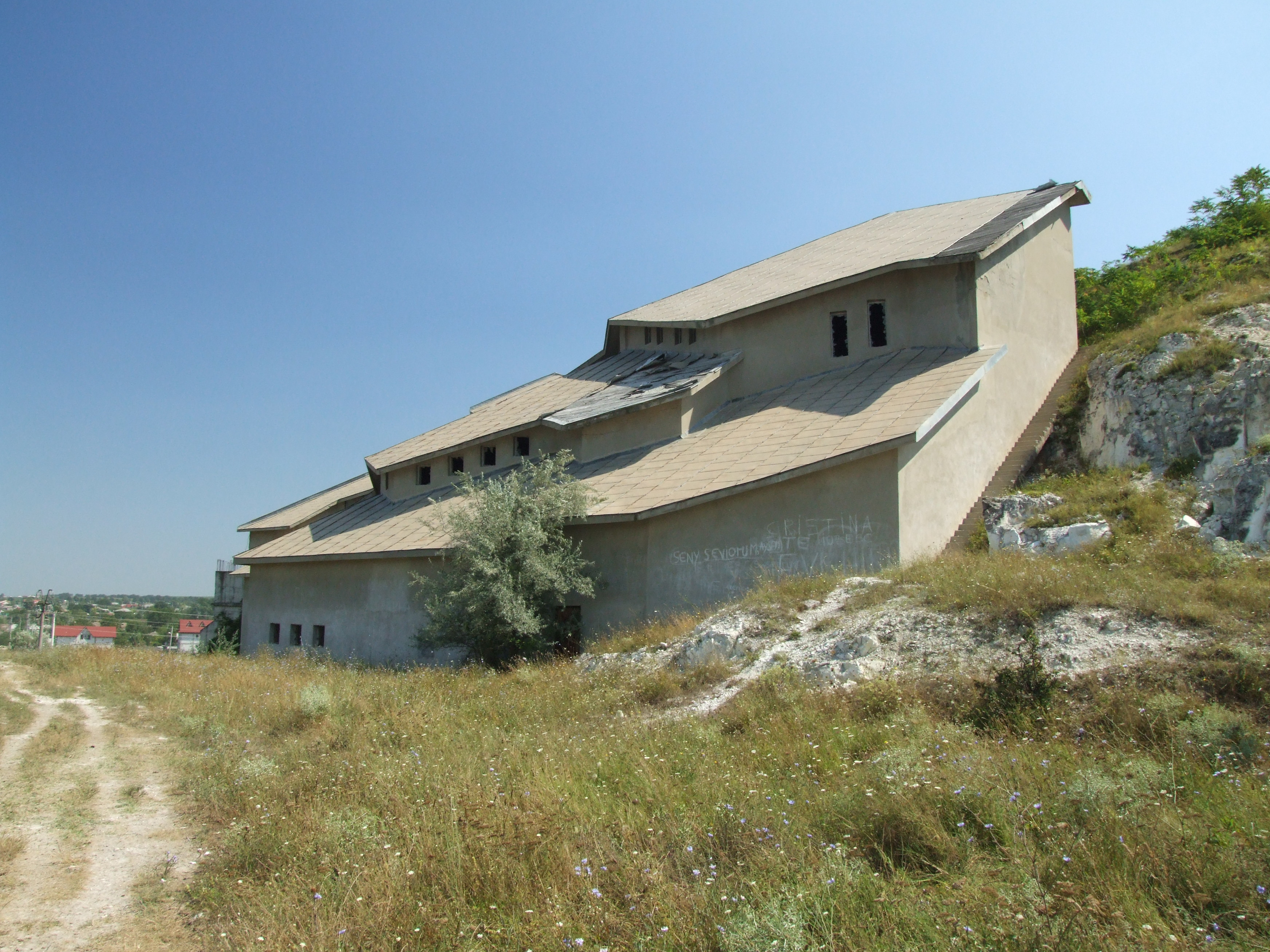
Basarabi Cave Complex

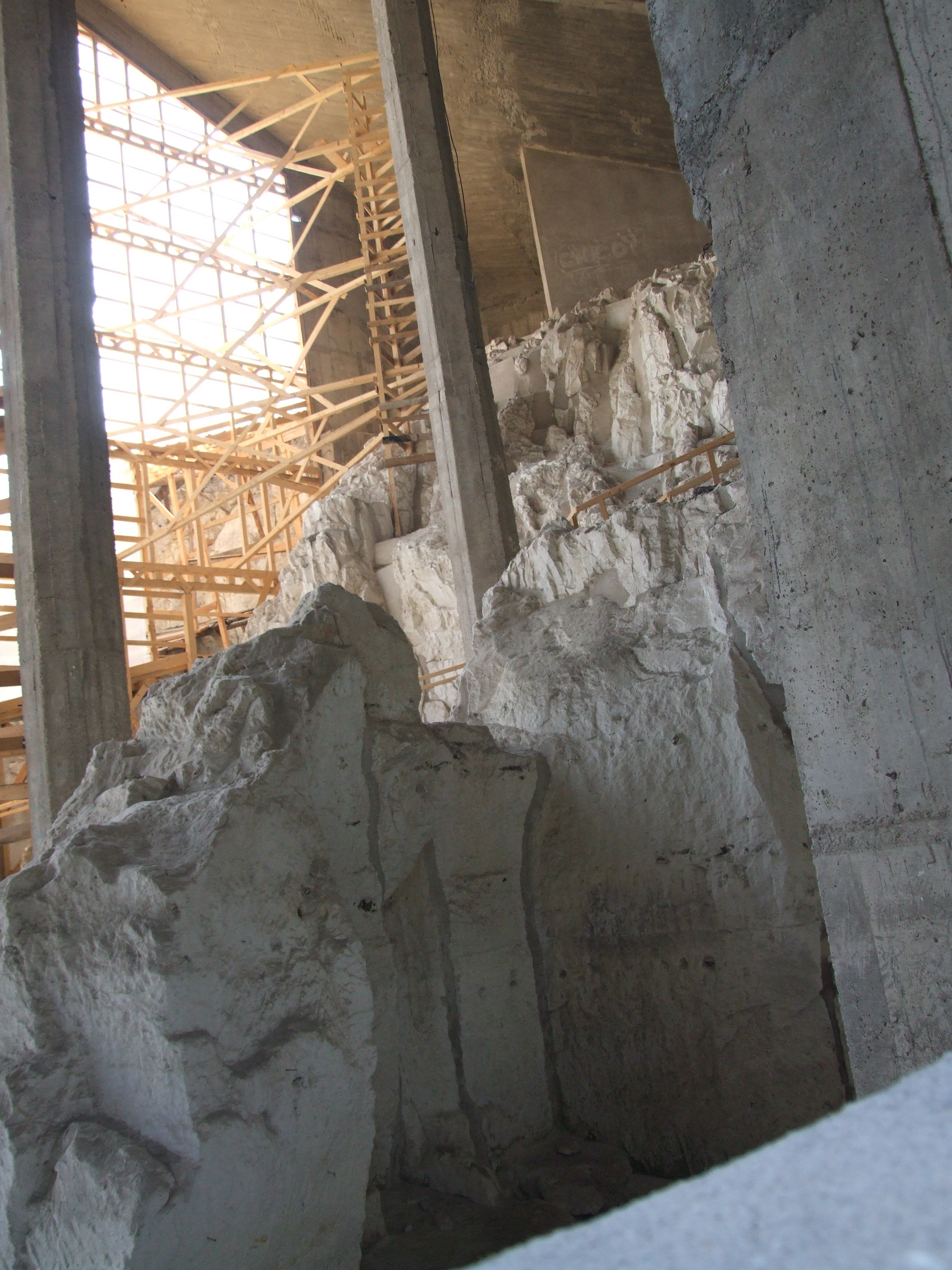
View from inside the Complex

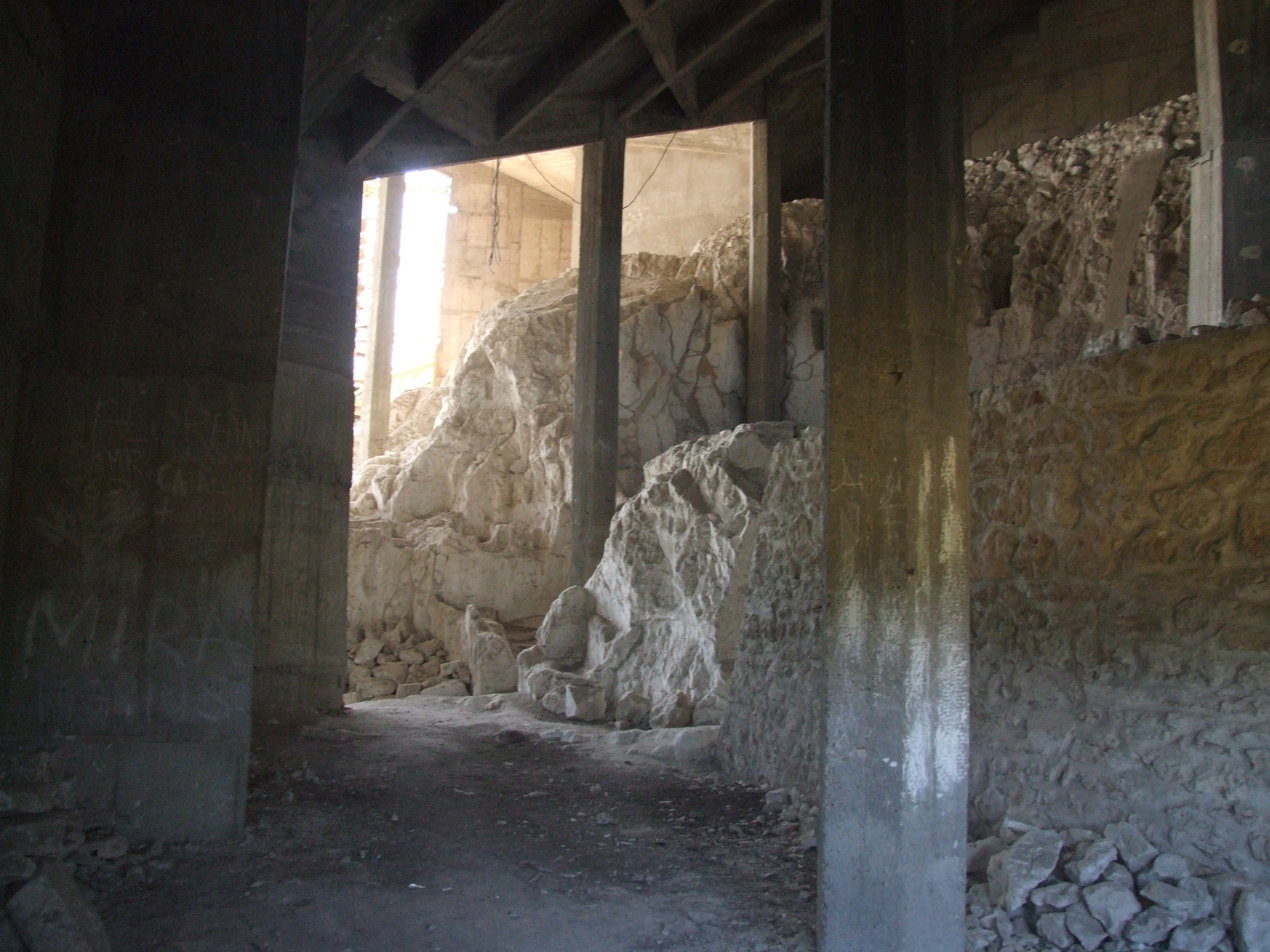
View from inside the Complex

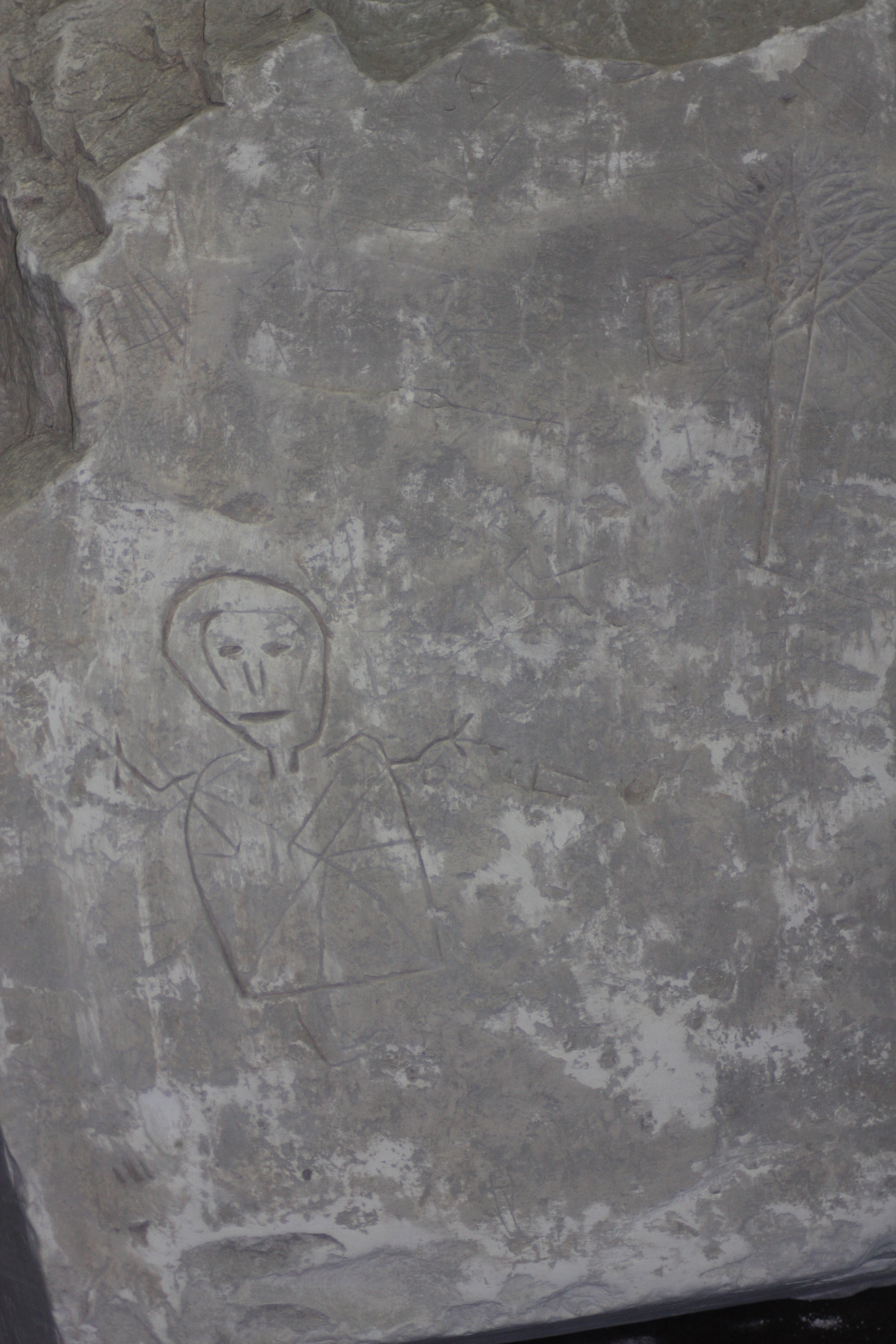
Graffiti from the Basarabi Complex exhibited in the History Museum of Constanṭa
