= Sormany, New Brunswick =

Sormany
- Unincorporated community
- Location of Sormany, New Brunswick
- Coordinates: 47.666945°N 65.870555°W
- Country: Canada
- Province: New Brunswick
- County: Gloucester
- Parish: Beresford
- Electoral Districts Federal: Acadie—Bathurst
- Provincial: Nepisiguit

Government
  - Type: Local service district
- Time zone: UTC-4 (AST)
  - Summer (DST): UTC-3 (ADT)
- Postal code(s): E8K
- Area code: 506
- Access Routes: Sormany Road via Route 322

Sormany is an unincorporated community in Gloucester County, New Brunswick, Canada.

== See also ==
- List of communities in New Brunswick
