= Olton Independent School District =

School district in Texas

Olton Independent School District is a public school district based in Olton, Texas (USA).

Located in Lamb County and serving the cities of Olton and Spade, a portion of the district extends into Hale County.

Olton ISD has three campuses: Olton High (grades 9–12), Olton Junior High (grades 6–8), and H.P. Webb Elementary (grades PreK–5).

In 2009, the school district was rated "academically acceptable" by the Texas Education Agency.

== History ==
In 1936 a school building was scheduled for construction.

On July 1, 2006, Spade Independent School District merged with Olton to form Olton ISD . Spade, formerly governed by Spade ISD, became governed by Olton ISD.
