= Rosete =

Rosete may refer to:

- Héctor Rosete, a football player
- Jimena Navarrete Rosete (born 1988), a Mexican model
- Maira Rosete, a dancer at the 2005 Southeast Asian Games dancesport competition
- Martin Rosete (born 1980), a Spanish film director and publicist
- Melanie Grace Rosete Bennett, the 2002 Canadian representative to Miss Earth
- Miguel Julio Rosete (born 1991), a Colombian football player
- Sarah Rosete, a member of R&B girl group Electrik Red
- A synonym for the Portuguese Baga grape variety
  - Rufete (grape), another Portuguese grape variety with Rosete as a synonym
- A barangay in San Felipe, Zambales Province, Philippines

== See also ==
- Rosette (disambiguation), about words with similar spelling
- Rosas (surname), of which Rosete is a spelling variation
