= Murfatlar =

- Town
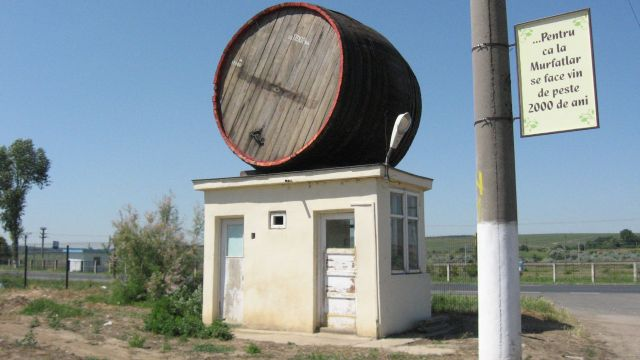

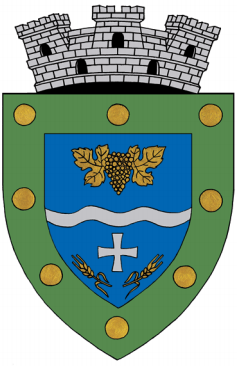
- Coat of arms

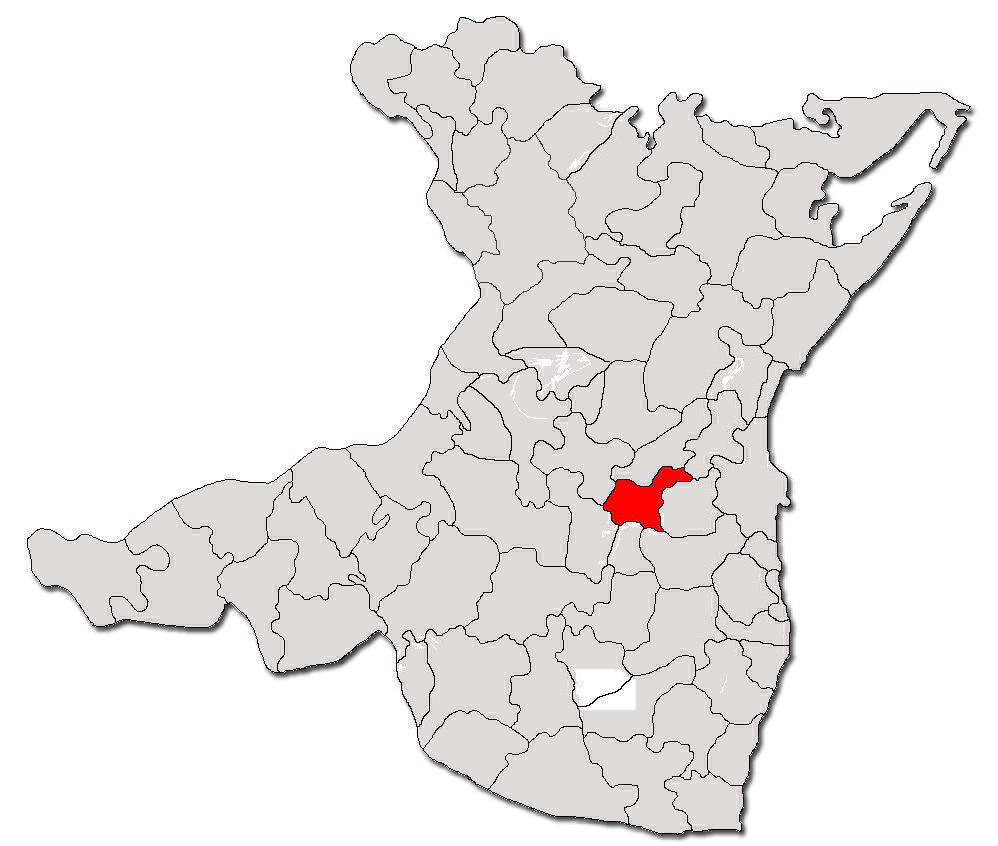
- Location in Constanța County

- Location in Romania
- Coordinates: 44°10′25″N 28°24′30″E
- Country: Romania
- County: Constanța
- Subdivisions: Siminoc

Government
  - Mayor (2024–2028): Gheorghe Cojocaru (PNL)
- Area: 69.25 km^{2} (26.74 sq mi)
- Elevation: 110 m (360 ft)
- Population (2021-12-01): 9,173
  - Density: 132.5/km^{2} (343.1/sq mi)
- Time zone: UTC+02:00 (EET)
  - Summer (DST): UTC+03:00 (EEST)
- Postal code: 905100
- Area code: (+40) 02 41
- Vehicle reg.: CT
- Website: www.primaria-murfatlar.ro

Murfatlar (Romanian pronunciation: [murfatˈlar]) is a town in Constanța County, Northern Dobruja, Romania. It officially became a town in 1989, as a result of the Romanian rural systematization program.

== Etymology ==
The name of the town originates from the Turkish word of Arabic origin murvet (meaning "generous man").

Between 1921 and 1965, and from 1975 to 2007, the locality was known as Basarabi. On June 26, 2007 the lower house of Romania's Parliament, the Chamber of Deputies, approved a proposal to have the name changed back to Murfatlar, which was also ratified by the Senate and promulgated by the president of Romania on December 20, 2007.

== Administration ==
Murfatlar is a port on the Danube–Black Sea Canal and has a population of 9, 173 as of 2021. A complex of caves was found carved in the hills nearby, see the Basarabi Cave Complex.

The village of Siminoc (historical name: Turc-Murfat) is administered by the town of Murfatlar. The name of the village comes from the flower Helichrysum arenarium (siminoc in Romanian), which can be found abundantly in the area.

The Murfatlar Vineyard and Basarabi Cave Complex are located nearby.

== Demographics ==
Historical population
Year	Pop.	±%
1992	10,742	—
2002	10,857	+1.1%
2011	9,634	−11.3%
2021	9,173	−4.8%
Source: Census data

At the 2021 census, Murfatlar had a population of 9,173. At the 2011 census, the town had 9,634 residents; of those, 8,657 were Romanians (89.86%), 547 Tatars (5.68%), 236 Roma (2.45%), 134 Turks (1.39%), 9 Hungarians (0.09%), 3 Aromanians (0.03%), 16 others (0.17%), and 32 with undeclared ethnicity (0.33%).

== Natives ==
Murfatlar is the birthplace of the 4th Romanian president, Traian Băsescu.

== Image gallery ==
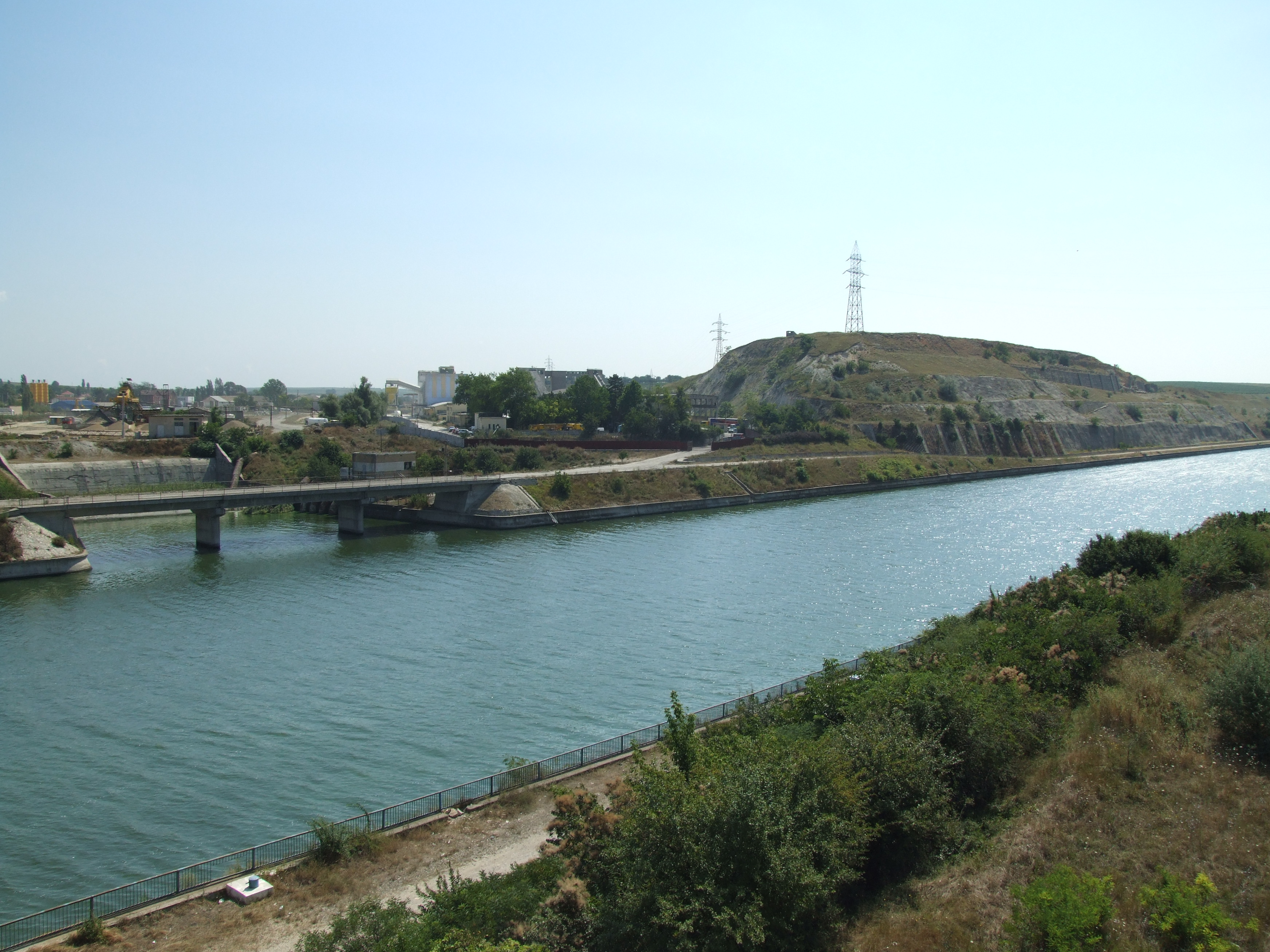
Danube–Black Sea Canal at Murfatlar

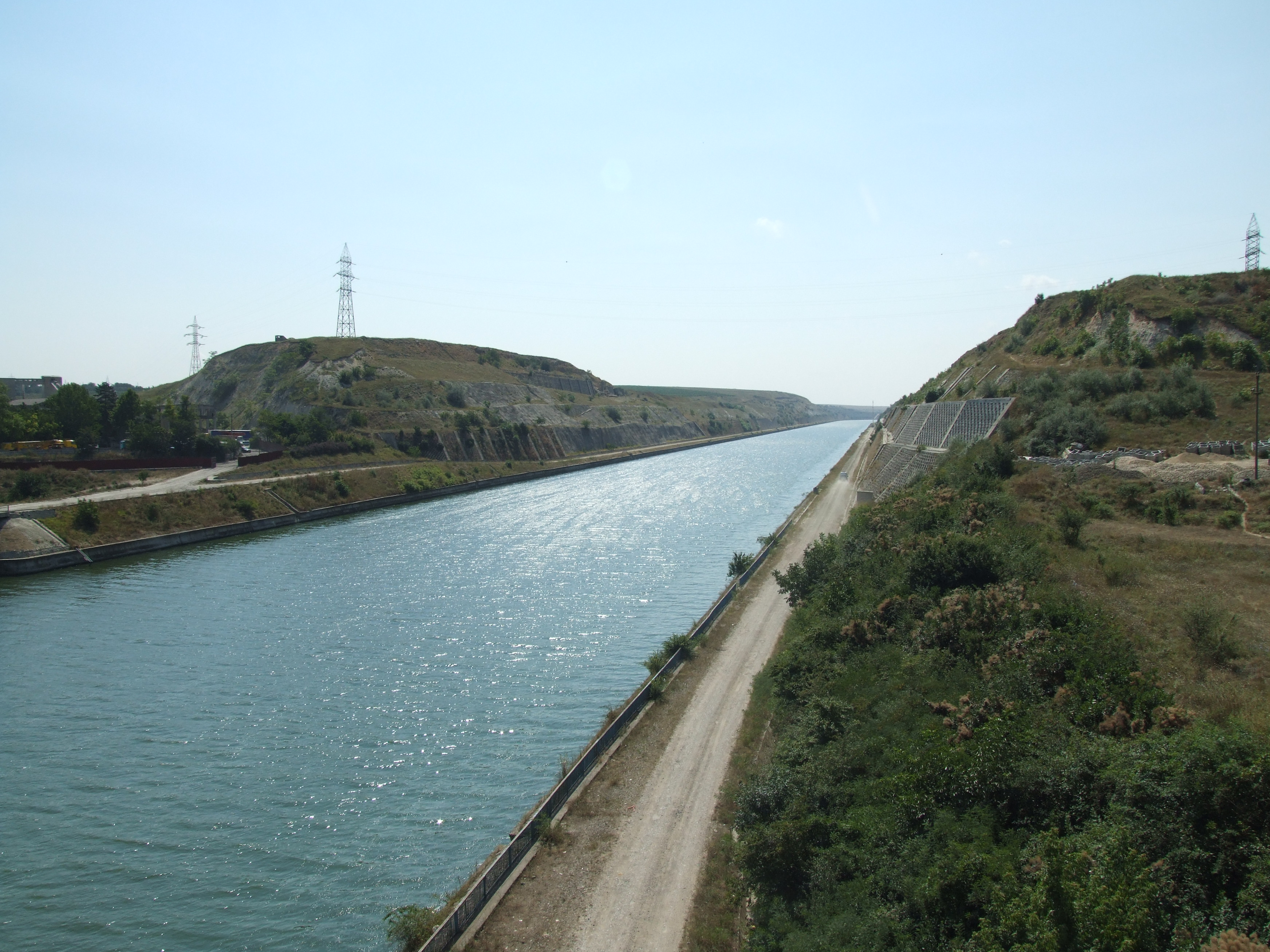
Danube–Black Sea Canal at Murfatlar

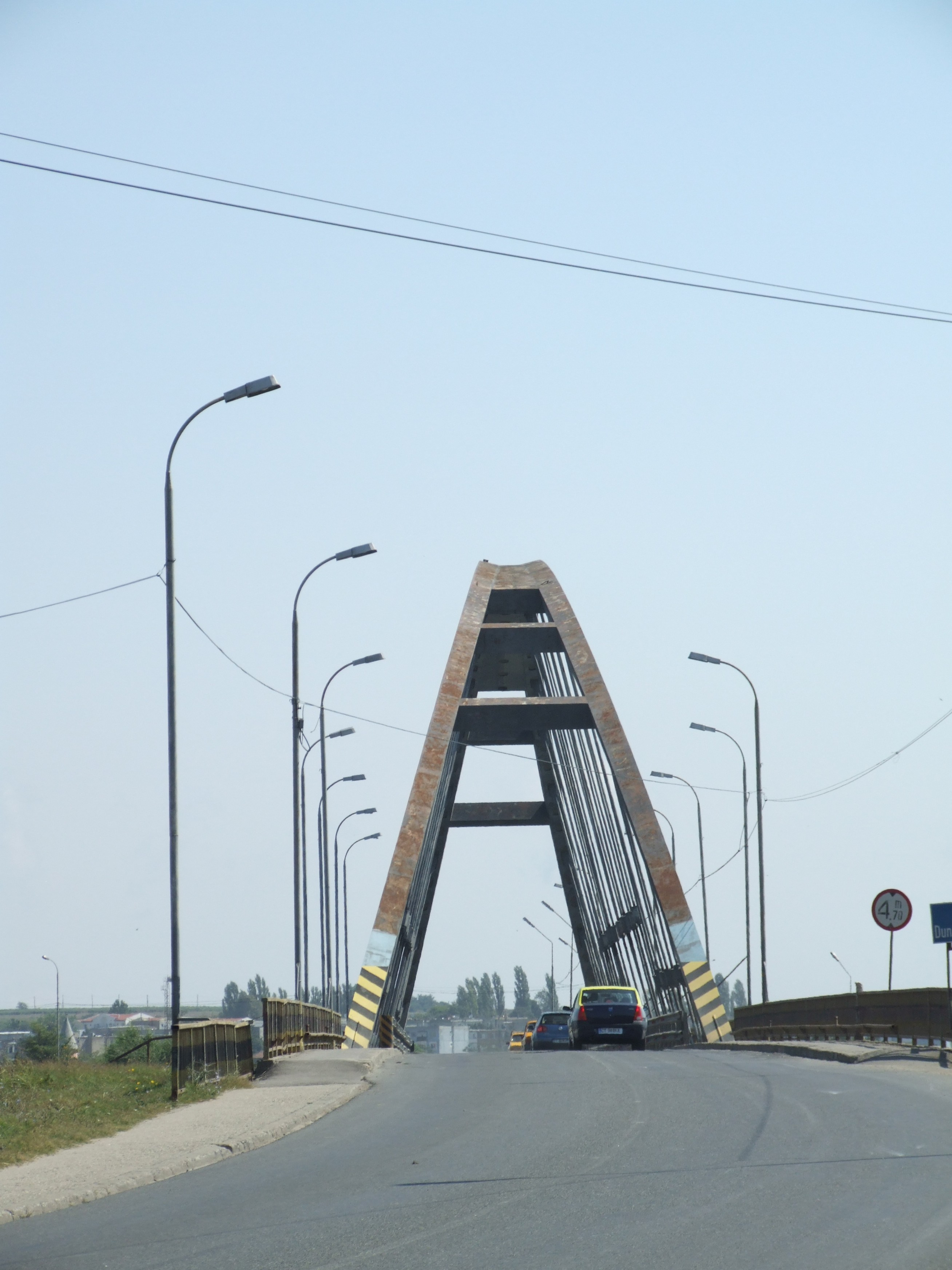
Bridge over the Danube–Black Sea Canal at Murfatlar
