= Beresford Parish =

Beresford
- Parish
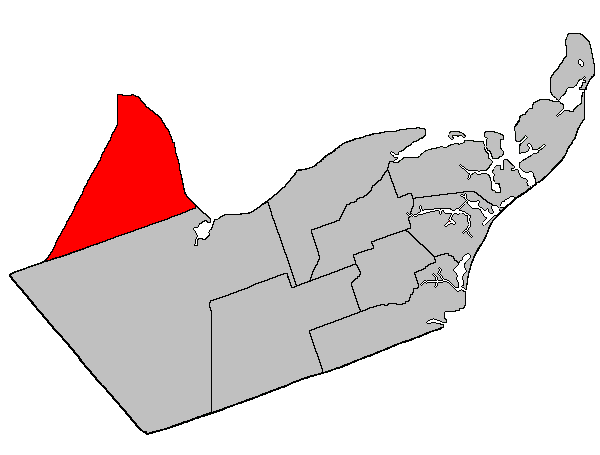
- Location within Gloucester County, New Brunswick
- Coordinates: 47.715°N 65.8875°W
- Country: Canada
- Province: New Brunswick
- County: Gloucester
- Erected: 1814

Area
  - Land: 455.61 km^{2} (175.91 sq mi)

Population (2021)
  - Total: 6,226
  - Density: 13.7/km^{2} (35/sq mi)
  - Change 2016-2021: ▼0.4%
  - Dwellings: 2,785
- Time zone: UTC-4 (AST)
  - Summer (DST): UTC-3 (ADT)
- Figures do not include portions within the town of Beresford and the villages of Belledune, Nigadoo, Petit-Rocher, and Pointe-Verte

Beresford is a geographic parish in Gloucester County, New Brunswick, Canada. (Note: The Territorial Division Act divides the province into 152 parishes, the cities of Saint John and Fredericton, and one town of Grand Falls. The Interpretation Act clarifies that parishes include any local government within their borders.)

For governance purposes it divided between the town of Belle-Baie, the village of Belledune, and the Chaleur rural district, all of which are members of the Chaleur Regional Service Commission.

Prior to the 2023 governance reform, the parish was divided between five municipalities and eight local service districts: the town of Beresford, New Brunswick; the villages of Belledune, Nigadoo, Petit-Rocher, and Pointe-Verte; and the LSDs of Dunlop, Laplante, (Note: Unlike the village it was named after, the LSD's name did not use an uppercase P.) Madran, Petit-Rocher-Nord (Devereaux), Petit-Rocher-Sud, Robertville, Tremblay, and the parish of Beresford, which in turn had seven named areas (often incorrectly called LSDs) receiving special services when they were created: Alcida and Dauversière; Nicholas-Denys, Free Grant and Sainte-Rosette; Petit Rocher West; (Note: More commonly known by its French form Petit-Rocher-Ouest.) Saint-Laurent Nord; Sainte-Louise; Sainte-Thérèse Sud; and Sormany. In the 2023 reform, Belledune was unaffected, while all the other municipalities were amalgamated to form Belle-Baie, which annexed all populated parts of the LSDs; the Crown land in the rear of the parish became part of the rural district. All community names remain in official use.

== Origin of name ==
The parish was named for Baron Beresford, Commander in Chief of the Portuguese Army during the Peninsular War. Six of the parishes erected simultaneously in Northumberland County in 1814 were named for prominent British military figures.

== History ==
Beresford was erected in 1814 from unassigned lands in the north of Northumberland County, including much of modern Restigouche County; all of the county north of the modern southern parish line of Beresford and east of the Restigouche River was included in the parish.

In 1827, all of the parish west of the Benjamin River was erected as Addington and Eldon Parishes.

In 1838, Restigouche County was erected, with the new county line beginning the same as today's but continuing in a straight line instead of turning partway along as it does now. Two years later, the Restigouche portion was erected into Colborne and Durham Parishes.

In 1881, the county line was moved to its modern position, putting the western part of interior settlements in Beresford.

== Boundaries ==
Beresford Parish is bounded:

- on the west by the Restigouche County line;
- on the north by Chaleur Bay;
- on the east by Chaleur Bay and Nepisiguit Bay;
- on the south by the northern line of two grants on the northern side of Kent Lodge Road in Beresford and its prolongation southwesterly to the Restigouche County line.

== Communities ==
Communities at least partly within the parish. bold indicates an incorporated municipality; italics indicate a name no longer in official use

- Alcida
- **Belledune**
  - Hodgin
  - Turgeon
- **Beresford**
- Dauversière
- Devereaux
- Dunlop
- Free Grant
- LaPlante
- Lincour
- Lugar
- Madran
- Massabielle
- Nicholas-Denys
- **Nigadoo**
- **Petit-Rocher**
- Petit-Rocher-Nord
- Petit-Rocher-Sud
- **Pointe-Verte**
- Robertville
- St. George
- Saint-Laurent
- Sainte-Louise
- Sainte-Rosette
- Sormany
- Tremblay
- Val-Michaud

== Bodies of water ==
Bodies of water (Note: Not including brooks, ponds or coves.) at least partly within the parish.

- Elmtree River (French Rivière aux Ormes)
- Little Elmtree River (French Petite Rivière aux Ormes)
- Millstream River
- Nigadoo River
- Tetagouche River
- Chaleur Bay
- Nepisiguit Bay
- Belledune Lake
- Lac à la Truite
- Meadow Lake
- Nigadoo Lake
- Otter Lake
- Lac à Paul

== Conservation areas ==
Parks, historic sites, and related entities at least partly within the parish.

- Jacquet River Gorge Protected Natural Area

== Demographics ==
=== Population ===
Parish population total does not include incorporated municipalities. Revised census figures based on the 2023 local governance reforms have not been released.

Canada census – Beresford community profile

	2021	2016	2011
Population	6,226 (-0.4% from 2016)	6,248 (-1.7% from 2011)	6,354 (+0.8% from 2006)
Land area	455.61 km^{2} (175.91 sq mi)	456.86 km^{2} (176.39 sq mi)	456.75 km^{2} (176.35 sq mi)
Population density	13.7/km^{2} (35/sq mi)	13.7/km^{2} (35/sq mi)	13.9/km^{2} (36/sq mi)
Median age	50.8 (M: 51.2, F: 50.8)	49.1 (M: 49.2, F: 48.9)	46.0 (M: 46.1, F: 46.0)
Private dwellings	2,785 (total) 2,672 (occupied)	2,780 (total)	2,730 (total)
Median household income	$69,500	$57,968	$53,109

References: 2021 2016 2011

Historical Census Data - Beresford Parish, New Brunswick

Year	Pop.	±%
1991	6,764	—
1996	6,830	+1.0%

Year	Pop.	±%
2001	6,622	−3.0%
2006	6,301	−4.8%

Year	Pop.	±%
2011	6,354	+0.8%
2016	6,248	−1.7%

=== Language ===
Canada Census Mother Tongue - Beresford Parish, New Brunswick
Census	Total	French			English			French & English			Other		
Year	Responses	Count	Trend	Pop %	Count	Trend	Pop %	Count	Trend	Pop %	Count	Trend	Pop %
2021	6,125	5,370	▼3.42%	87.67%	590	▲15.69%	9.43%	145	▲163.63%	2.37%	20	▲30.77%	0.32%
2016	6,135	5,560	▼3.39%	90.63%	510	▲17.24%	8.31%	55	▼8.33%	0.90%	16	▼36.0%	0.26%
2011	6,275	5,755	▲3.2%	91.71%	435	▼8.4%	6.93%	60	▼36.8%	0.96%	25	▼58.3%	0.40%
2006	6,205	5,575	▼5.9%	89.85%	475	▼5.0%	7.65%	95	▲26.7%	1.53%	60	▲200.0%	0.97%
2001	6,520	5,925	▼3.7%	90.87%	500	▼12.3%	7.67%	75	▲50.0%	1.15%	20	▲100.0%	0.31%
1996	6,785	6,155	n/a	90.71%	570	n/a	8.40%	50	n/a	0.74%	10	n/a	0.15%

== Access Routes ==
Highways and numbered routes that run through the parish, including external routes that start or finish at the parish limits:

- **Highways**
  - Route 11
- **Principal Routes**
  - Route 134
- Secondary Routes:
  - Route 315
  - Route 322
- External Routes:
  - None

== See also ==
- List of parishes in New Brunswick
