= Rosetti =

Rosetti may refer to:

- Rosetti (company), a fashion brand, producing handbags and accessories
- Rosette (cookie) (rosetti), a Finnish dessert
- Rosetti family
- Piața Rosetti, a small square in Bucharest, Romania

== People with the surname ==
- Alexandru Rosetti, Romanian linguist
- Antonio Rosetti (c. 1750–1792), a classical-era composer
- Constantin Rosetti (C. A. Rosetti; 1816–1885), Romanian literary and political leader, of noble Byzantine descent
- Gino Rossetti (former name Rosetti, 1904–1992), Italian football player
- Lascaris Rosetti (1580–1646), high chancellor of the Patriarchate of Constantinople; Cantacuzino family § Family tree of notable members
  - Bella Rosetti (1534–1594, died 17th century), wife of Lascaris Rosetti; Cantacuzino family § Family tree of notable members
  - Constantin Rosetti (1600–1688), son of Bella and Lascaris Rosetti; Cantacuzino family § Family tree of notable members
  - Antonie Rosetti (c. 1615–1685), son of Bella and Lascaris Rosetti
- Maria Rosetti (1819–1893), an English-born Wallachian and Romanian political activist
- Maria Tescanu Rosetti (1879–1968), Romanian aristocrat and lady-in-waiting
- Nicolae Rosetti-Bălănescu (1827–1884), lawyer and Romanian politician
- Radu D. Rosetti (1874–1964), Romanian author and lawyer
- Radu R. Rosetti (1877–1949), Romanian general and historian
- Roberto Rosetti (born 1967), Italian football referee
- Theodor Rosetti (1837–1932), Romanian writer, journalist and politician who served as Prime Minister of Romania

== See also ==
- C. A. Rosetti (disambiguation)
- Rossetti (disambiguation)
- Roseți
- Rosseti
- Rosette (disambiguation)
