= Rosetta Stone (disambiguation) =

The Rosetta Stone is an ancient artifact used to decipher Egyptian hieroglyphs.

Rosetta Stone may also refer to:

== Music ==
- Rosetta Stone (band), a British gothic-rock band formed in 1988
- Rosetta Stone (1970s band), a rock band formed in 1977 by Ian Mitchell
- "Rosetta Stone", a 1992 song by Throwing Muses from Red Heaven

== Other uses ==
- Rosetta Stone (project), a language archive project
- Rosetta Stone (software), language learning software
  - Rosetta Stone (company), a software company
- Rosetta Stone Learning Center, a language school
- Double Dragon 3: The Rosetta Stone, a 1990 video game
- Rosetta Stone, a pen name used by Dr. Seuss for his book Because a Little Bug Went Ka-Choo
- Rosetta Stona, the main protagonist of the 2002 film Teknolust
- Sister Rosetta Stone, a fictional teacher for whom Sister Mary Elephant substitutes

== See also ==
- Rosetta (disambiguation)
- Rosetta Pebble, an acoustic folk ensemble
- "Rosetta Stoned", a song by Tool from 10,000 Days
