= Rosetta (given name) =

Rosetta is a female given name. Notable people with the name include:

- Rosetta Baume (1871–1934), American-born New Zealand teacher, feminist and community leader
- Rosetta Burke (born 1937), the first female Assistant Adjutant General of New York State and of the Army National Guard
- Rosetta Calavetta (1914–1993), Italian actress and voice actress
- Rosetta Cattaneo (1919–1988), Italian sprinter
- Rosetta Cutolo (1937–2023), sister of the notorious Camorra boss Raffaele Cutolo
- Rosetta Douglass (1839–1906), American teacher and activist, daughter of Frederick Douglass
- Rosetta Luce Gilchrist (1850–1921), American physician, author, poet, and correspondent
- Rosetta Sherwood Hall (1865–1951), American medical missionary and educator
- Rosetta Hightower (born 1944), American singer
- Rosetta Howard (1914–1974), American blues singer
- Rosetta LeNoire (1911–2002), American stage, screen and television actress
- Rosetta Loy (1931–2022), Italian writer
- Rosetta Pampanini (1896–1973), Italian soprano
- Rosetta Reitz (1924–2008), American feminist, jazz historian and music producer
- Rosetta Smith (c. 1770–1775 – c. 1825), Afro-Trinidadian slave trader and entrepreneur
- Sister Rosetta Tharpe (1915–1973), American singer, songwriter, and guitarist

Fictional characters:

- Rosetta Cammeniti, from the Australian soap opera Neighbours
- Rosetta, in the Disney Fairies franchise
- Rosetta (ロゼッタ), Japanese name of the Super Mario character Rosalina
- Cure Rosetta (キュアロゼッタ, Kyua Rozetta), the Pretty Cure form of Alice Yotsuba from DokiDoki! PreCure
