= Sainte-Rosette, New Brunswick =

Sainte-Rosette
- Unincorporated community
- Location within New Brunswick.
- Coordinates: 47.72°N 65.80°W
- Country: Canada
- Province: New Brunswick
- County: Gloucester
- Parish: Beresford
- Electoral Districts Federal: Acadie—Bathurst
- Provincial: Restigouche-Chaleur

Government
  - Type: Local service district
- Time zone: UTC-4 (AST)
  - Summer (DST): UTC-3 (ADT)
- Postal code(s): E8K
- Area code: 506
- Highways: None

Sainte-Rosette is an unincorporated community in Gloucester County, New Brunswick, Canada.

== See also ==
- List of communities in New Brunswick
