= Olton, Texas =

- City
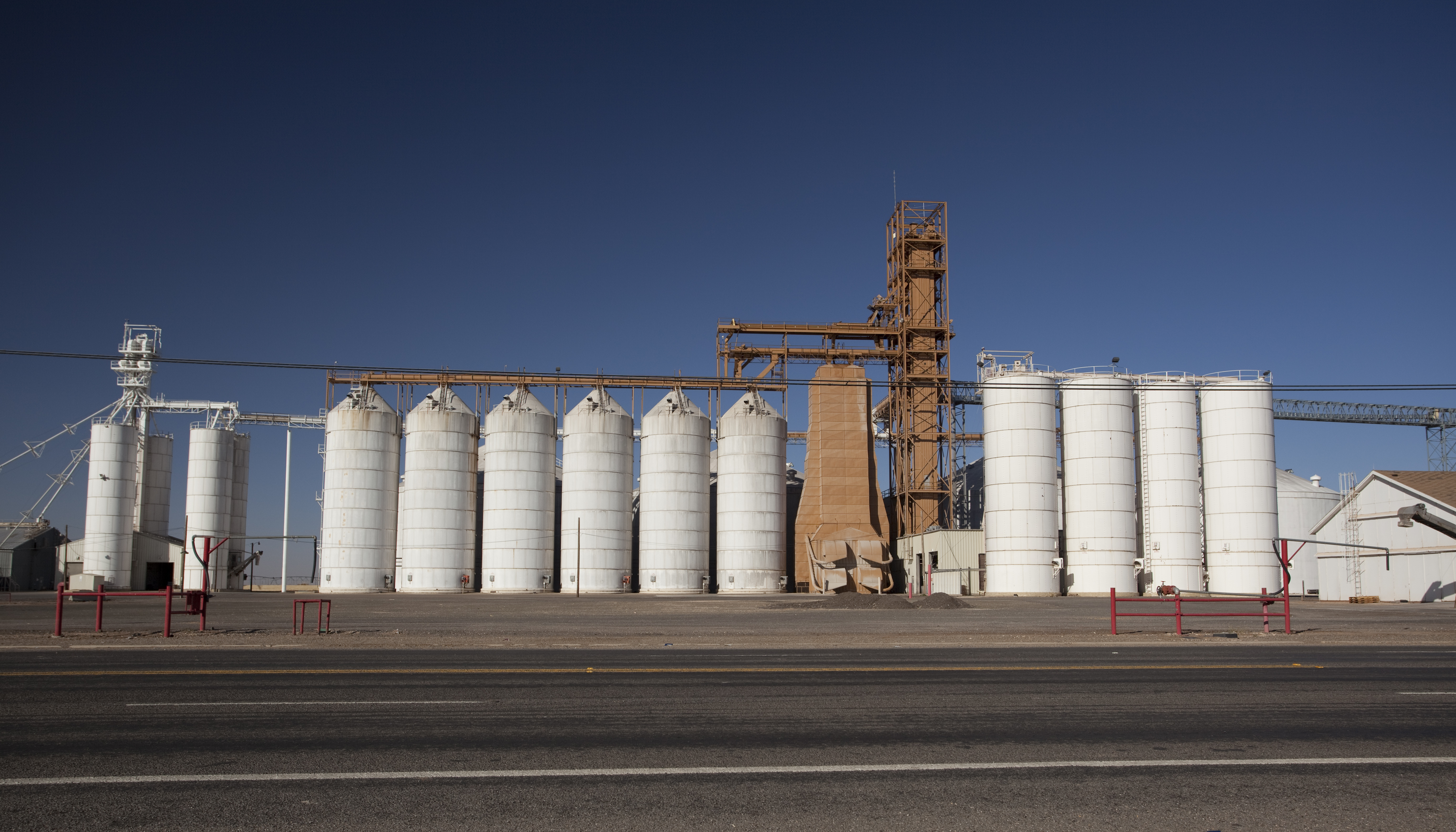
- Olton Grain Cooperative

- Location within Texas
- Coordinates: 34°11′00″N 102°08′05″W
- Country: United States
- State: Texas
- County: Lamb
- Region: Llano Estacado
- Established: 1906

Area
  - Total: 1.36 sq mi (3.52 km^{2})
  - Land: 1.36 sq mi (3.52 km^{2})
  - Water: 0 sq mi (0.00 km^{2})
- Elevation: 3,612 ft (1,101 m)

Population (2020)
  - Total: 1,989
  - Density: 1,460/sq mi (565/km^{2})
- Time zone: UTC-6 (CST)
- ZIP code: 79064
- Area code: 806
- FIPS code: 48-54012
- Website: https://cityofolton.com/

Olton is a city in Lamb County, Texas, United States. The population was 1,989 at the 2020 census.

== History ==
Olton was first settled in 1900. As the first town in Lamb County, Olton became the county seat in 1908. Olton was incorporated in 1930. In 1946, the county seat was moved to Littlefield.

== Geography ==
According to the United States Census Bureau, the city has a total area of 1.4 square miles (3.6 km^{2}), all of it land.

=== Climate ===
According to the Köppen climate classification, Olton has a semiarid climate, BSk on climate maps.

Climate data for Olton, Texas (1991–2020 normals, extremes 1942–1953, 1964–present)
Month	Jan	Feb	Mar	Apr	May	Jun	Jul	Aug	Sep	Oct	Nov	Dec	Year
Record high °F (°C)	81 (27)	86 (30)	91 (33)	98 (37)	105 (41)	108 (42)	108 (42)	110 (43)	102 (39)	96 (36)	89 (32)	81 (27)	110 (43)
Mean daily maximum °F (°C)	52.5 (11.4)	56.9 (13.8)	64.7 (18.2)	72.8 (22.7)	80.6 (27.0)	88.6 (31.4)	90.3 (32.4)	88.9 (31.6)	82.3 (27.9)	72.9 (22.7)	61.8 (16.6)	52.8 (11.6)	72.1 (22.3)
Daily mean °F (°C)	38.8 (3.8)	42.3 (5.7)	49.9 (9.9)	57.8 (14.3)	67.0 (19.4)	75.7 (24.3)	78.2 (25.7)	76.8 (24.9)	69.8 (21.0)	59.2 (15.1)	47.9 (8.8)	39.6 (4.2)	58.6 (14.8)
Mean daily minimum °F (°C)	25.2 (−3.8)	27.8 (−2.3)	35.1 (1.7)	42.9 (6.1)	53.5 (11.9)	62.8 (17.1)	66.2 (19.0)	64.7 (18.2)	57.4 (14.1)	45.4 (7.4)	34.0 (1.1)	26.4 (−3.1)	45.1 (7.3)
Record low °F (°C)	−7 (−22)	−5 (−21)	5 (−15)	14 (−10)	27 (−3)	41 (5)	47 (8)	48 (9)	29 (−2)	15 (−9)	−1 (−18)	−6 (−21)	−7 (−22)
Average precipitation inches (mm)	0.62 (16)	0.58 (15)	1.20 (30)	1.18 (30)	2.29 (58)	2.73 (69)	2.33 (59)	2.46 (62)	2.39 (61)	1.62 (41)	0.81 (21)	0.80 (20)	19.01 (483)
Average snowfall inches (cm)	1.3 (3.3)	1.6 (4.1)	0.7 (1.8)	0.2 (0.51)	0.0 (0.0)	0.0 (0.0)	0.0 (0.0)	0.0 (0.0)	0.0 (0.0)	0.2 (0.51)	1.6 (4.1)	2.2 (5.6)	7.8 (20)
Average precipitation days (≥ 0.01 in)	2.8	3.1	4.0	3.8	6.0	6.6	5.5	6.7	5.6	4.0	2.8	3.7	54.6
Average snowy days (≥ 0.1 in)	1.1	0.9	0.4	0.1	0.0	0.0	0.0	0.0	0.0	0.2	0.6	1.4	4.7
Source: NOAA

== Demographics ==
Historical population
Census	Pop.	Note	%±
1930	687		—
1940	782		13.8%
1950	1,201		53.6%
1960	1,917		59.6%
1970	1,782		−7.0%
1980	2,235		25.4%
1990	2,116		−5.3%
2000	2,288		8.1%
2010	2,215		−3.2%
2020	1,989		−10.2%
U.S. Decennial Census

As of 2023, the southern portion of the city is majority Hispanic and Latino while the northern portion is mainly non-Hispanic Anglo White. The northern side has more wealth.

=== 2020 census ===
As of the 2020 census, there were 1,989 people, 614 households, and 435 families residing in the city; the median age was 35.4 years, 29.5% of residents were under the age of 18, and 17.7% were 65 years of age or older. For every 100 females there were 95.4 males, and for every 100 females age 18 and over there were 92.6 males.

There were 697 households in Olton, of which 39.7% had children under the age of 18 living in them. Of all households, 49.6% were married-couple households, 19.2% were households with a male householder and no spouse or partner present, and 26.4% were households with a female householder and no spouse or partner present. About 26.1% of all households were made up of individuals and 13.5% had someone living alone who was 65 years of age or older.

There were 826 housing units, of which 15.6% were vacant. The homeowner vacancy rate was 1.3% and the rental vacancy rate was 13.7%.

0.0% of residents lived in urban areas, while 100.0% lived in rural areas.

Racial composition as of the 2020 census
Race	Number	Percent
White	800	40.2%
Black or African American	16	0.8%
American Indian and Alaska Native	7	0.4%
Asian	0	0.0%
Native Hawaiian and Other Pacific Islander	1	0.1%
Some other race	451	22.7%
Two or more races	714	35.9%
Hispanic or Latino (of any race)	1,543	77.6%

=== 2000 census ===
As of the census of 2000, 2,288 people, 742 households, and 571 families resided in the city. The population density was 1,683.8 inhabitants per square mile (650.1/km^{2}). The 852 housing units averaged 627.0 per square mile (241.9/km^{2}). The racial makeup of the city was 66.56% White, 2.01% African American, 1.31% Native American, 0.09% Asian, 27.49% from other races, and 2.53% from two or more races. Hispanics or Latinos of any race were 64.51% of the population.

Of the 742 households, 42.3% had children under the age of 18 living with them, 59.6% were married couples living together, 11.7% had a female householder with no husband present, and 23% were not families. About 20.9% of all households were made up of individuals, and 11.3% had someone living alone who was 65 years of age or older. The average household size was 2.99 and the average family size was 3.47.

In the city, the population was distributed as 33.9% under the age of 18, 7.6% from 18 to 24, 23.3% from 25 to 44, 18.7% from 45 to 64, and 16.6% who were 65 years of age or older. The median age was 32 years. For every 100 females, there were 97.1 males. For every 100 females aged 18 and over, there were 84.2 males.

The median income for a household in the city was $24,010, and for a family was $25,926. Men had a median income of $22,358 versus $18,833 for women. The per capita income for the city was $10,189. About 21.4% of families and 24.9% of the population were below the poverty line, including 28.6% of those under age 18 and 21.8% of those age 65 or over.

== Education ==
The City of Olton is served by the Olton Independent School District.

== Media ==
The local weekly newspaper was the Olton Enterprise. The Olton Enterprise stopped publication in 2021.

As of 2023 there is one newspaper, Lamb County Leader-News, in all of Lamb County.

== Notable people ==
- Jimmy Dean, American country music singer, actor, television host, and businessman
- Peggy Sue Gerron, inspiration for the Buddy Holly song "Peggy Sue"
- Jerry Sisemore, football player, offensive lineman for the Philadelphia Eagles
- Dawn DeBerry Stump, businesswoman and government official

== See also ==
- Spade Ranch (Texas)
- Llano Estacado
- Blackwater Draw
- Yellow House Draw
