= Rosanes =

Rosanes is a surname. Notable people with the surname include:

- Jakob Rosanes (1842–1922), German mathematician
- Judah Rosanes (1657–1727), Rabbi of Constantinople
