= Rosales (surname) =

Rosales is used as a name in historic and current Spanish countries. Notable people with the name include:

- José de Patiño y Rosales (1666–1736), Spanish statesman
- José Rosales Herrador (1827–1891), Acting President of El Salvador in 1885
- Vicente Pérez Rosales (1807–1886), Spanish politician and traveller
- Joaquín Bernardo Calvo Rosales (1799–1865), Costa Rican politician
- Adam Rosales, American baseball player
- Albenis Antonio Rosales (born 1983), Venezuelan judoka
- Andrea Rosales Castillejos (born 1991), Venezuelan model and beauty pageant titleholder
- Angelica Rosales, American businessperson and anti-abortion advocate
- Angelo Kelly-Rosales (born 1993), Honduran-American footballer
- Antonio Rosales (c. 1740–1801), Spanish composer
- Antonio Ruiz-Rosales (born 1984), Mexican tennis player
- Armando Romero Rosales (born 1950), Mexican politician
- Benito Rosales (1795–1850), Nicaraguan politician, head of state in 1849
- Brian Rosales Sarracent (born 1995), Cuban footballer
- Carmen Rosales, Filipino actress
- Catalina Rosales, Mexican Paralympic athlete
- Celia Zaldumbide Rosales (1926–2014), Ecuadorian pianist, teacher, and cultural manager
- César Miguel Rosales Tardío (born 1970), Peruvian footballer
- Cristofer Jordan Rosales González (born 1994), Nicaraguan professional boxer
- Edmund Rosales, Filipino astronomer and meteorologist and a former president of the Philippine Astronomical Society
- Damian Rosales (born 1991), Mexican born American soccer player
- Eduardo Rosales (1836–1873), Spanish artist
- Elena Gallegos Rosales (1882–1954), Salvadoran-born wife of the 24th President of Costa Rica
- Elisa Ochoa (1897–1978), the first woman elected to the Philippine Congress in 1941
- Elvira Rodríguez Leonardi de Rosales, Argentine politician
- Etta Rosales, Filipino human rights activist
- Exar Javier Rosales Sánchez (born 1984), Peruvian footballer
- Fabiana Rosales Guerrero (born 1992), also known as Fabiana Rosales de Guaidó, Venezuelan journalist and social media human rights activist
- Gaudencio Rosales (born 1932), Filipino cardinal, current Archbishop emeritus of Manila
- Guillermo Rosales (1946–1993), Cuban novelist
- Harmonia Rosales, American artist
- Hector Rosales (born 1958), Uruguayan poet and writer
- Isabel Rosales Pareja (1895–1961), Ecuadorian piano prodigy
- Jaime Rosales, Honduran football player
- Jaime Rosales (director), Spanish film director, screenwriter and film producer
- Jennifer Rosales, Filipino golfer
- Jericho Rosales, Filipino actor
- José Luis Rosales (born 1943), Salvadoran sports shooter
- José Manuel Ramírez Rosales (1804–1877), Chilean painter
- José Rosales (footballer) (born 1993), Guatemalan footballer
- Julio Rosales, Cardinal Archbishop of Cebu, Philippines
- Jūratė Regina Statkutė de Rosales, Lithuanian-born Venezuelan journalist and researcher
- Kris Rosales (born 1990), Filipino-American professional basketball player
- Leo Rosales, American baseball player
- Lina Rosales (born 1928), Spanish film and television actress
- Luis Rosales, Spanish poet
- Luis Ortiz Rosales, Spanish graphic artist
- Manuel Rosales, Venezuelan politician
- Mauricio Rosales (born 1992), Argentine professional footballer
- Mauro Rosales, Argentine football player
- Mayra Rosales (born 1980), American woman known for being, at one point, the heaviest living woman
- Manuel Rosales (organ builder), American organ builder
- Michel Rosales (born 1983), Mexican professional boxer
- Miguel Rosales (born 1961), principal designer of Rosales + Partners, an architecture firm based in Boston
- Milangela Rosales (born 1987), Venezuelan race walker
- Paulo Rosales (born 1984), Argentine footballer
- Reynaldo Rosales, American actor
- Ricardo Rosales (footballer) (born 1993), Argentine-born Chilean professional footballer
- Ricardo Rosales (politician) (1934–2020), head of the Guatemalan Party of Labour
- RJ Rosales, Filipino-Australian singer and actor
- Roberto Rosales, Venezuelan football player
- Rosa Rosales, American political activist
- Rubén Alonso Rosales (1925–2000), Salvadoran political figure
- Samuel Rosales Olmos, Mexican politician
- Saudy Rosales Beneditt (born 1985), Costa Rican footballer
- Sergio Rosales, Venezuelan conductor
- Thomas Rosales, Jr. (born 1948), American actor and stuntman
- Ulises Rosales del Toro, Cuban general
- Vannesa Rosales (born 1989), Venezuelan activist and teacher
- Víctor Rosales (1776–1817), Mexican military
- Victor Vazquez Rosales (born 1989), Spanish footballer
- Voltaire Y. Rosales, Filipino judge
- William Rosales Pérez (1954–2013), Puerto Rican politician

== See also ==
- Rosas (surname), a which Rosales is a spelling variation
