= Pliska rosette =

Seven-pointed bronze rosette in Bulgaria

The Pliska rosette

The Pliska Rosette is a seven-pointed bronze rosette found in 1961 in Pliska, the medieval capital of Bulgaria. It is dated by archeologists to the 7th-9th century.

== Description ==
It is in the shape of a seven-pointed star and 38 mm in diameter. It is inscribed with Proto-Bulgar signs of the Murfatlar type. Each ray is inscribed with two signs and an IYI symbol can be seen on the back.

== Modern use ==
Representations of the medallion's design are often used (along with the symbol IYI and first letter from the glagolitic alphabet -) by nationalist movements in Bulgaria.

The Rosette features in the film In the Name of the King 3: The Last Mission by director Uwe Boll. It's tattooed on the arm of Hazen Kaine played by Dominic Purcell and has an important role in the plot of the film.
