= Spade, Texas =

Unincorporated community in Texas, US

- Census-designated place
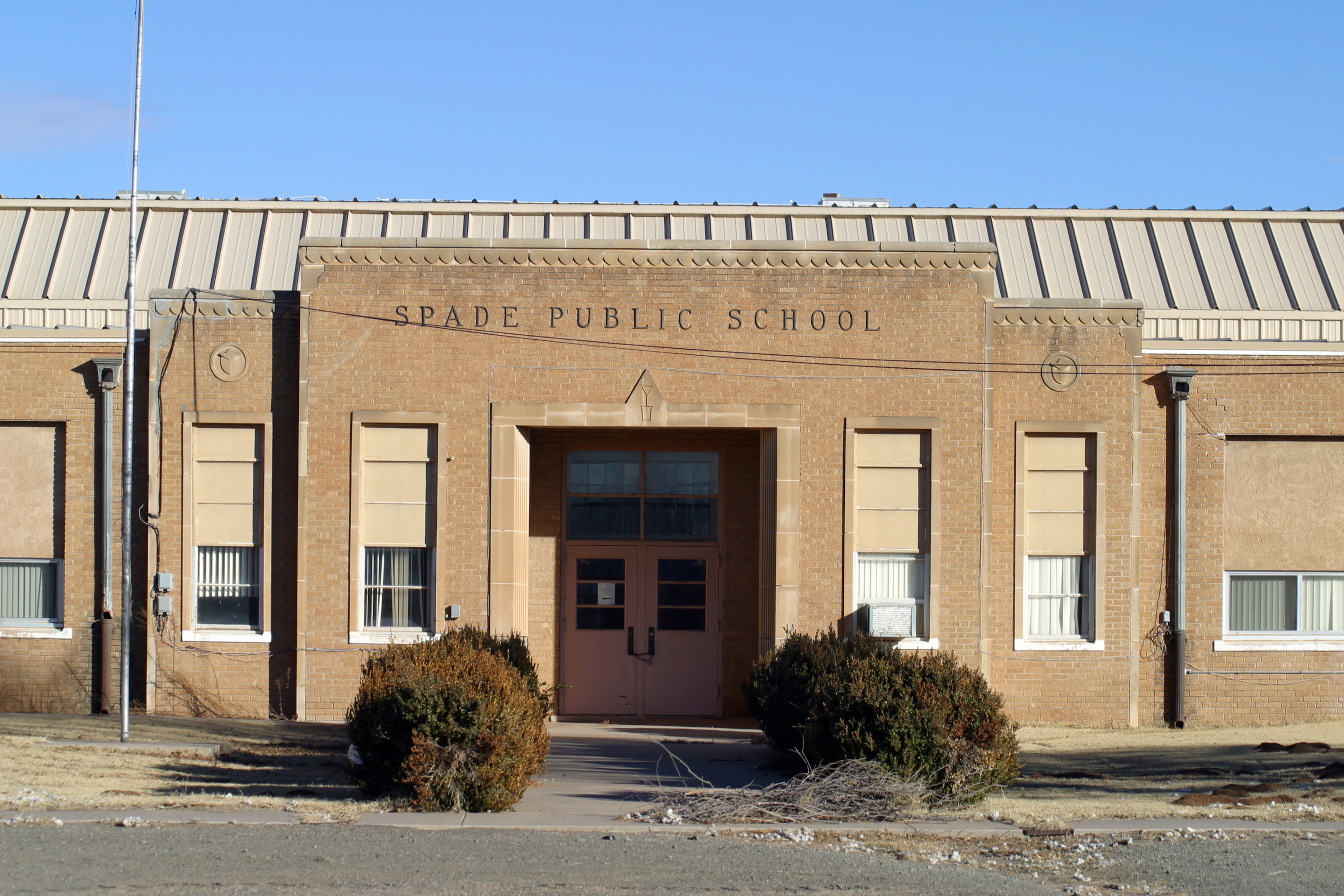
- Former Spade Public School

- Location within Texas Location within the United States
- Coordinates: 33°55′34″N 102°09′13″W
- Country: United States
- State: Texas
- County: Lamb
- Region: Llano Estacado
- Established: 1924

Area
  - Total: 1.87 sq mi (4.85 km^{2})
  - Land: 1.87 sq mi (4.85 km^{2})
  - Water: 0 sq mi (0.0 km^{2})
- Elevation: 3,517 ft (1,072 m)

Population (2020)
  - Total: 71
  - Density: 38/sq mi (15/km^{2})
- Time zone: UTC-6 (CST)
  - Summer (DST): UTC-5 (CDT)
- ZIP code: 79369
- Area code: 806
- FIPS code: 48-59156
- GNIS feature ID: 1368863

Spade is an unincorporated community and census-designated place (CDP) in Lamb County, Texas, United States. The population was 71 at the 2020 census.

== History ==
Spade was named for its location on the former Spade Ranch. J. Frank Norfleet, ranch foreman, married and brought his wife to headquarters near the present townsite in 1894. The townsite was founded in 1924 when farmers began settling on former ranchland. A store and a cotton gin were built in 1931, which became the nucleus of the community. A post office was secured in 1935 and by 1940 Spade had two churches, six businesses, and 200 people. Spade has its own water system that draws on the underlying Ogallala Aquifer.

== Geography ==
Spade is located at the intersection of Farm to Market Roads 54 and 168, 10 miles (16 km) east of Littlefield in southeast Lamb County.

According to the United States Census Bureau, the CDP has a total area of 1.9 square miles (4.8 km^{2}), all of it land.

== Demographics ==
Historical population
Census	Pop.	Note	%±
2000	100		—
2010	73		−27.0%
2020	71		−2.7%
U.S. Decennial Census; 1850–1900 1910; 1920 1930 1940; 1950 1960 1970; 1980 1990 2000; 2010 2020

Spade first appeared as a census designated place in the 2000 U.S. census.

=== 2020 census ===
Spade CDP, Texas – Racial and ethnic composition Note: the US Census treats Hispanic/Latino as an ethnic category. This table excludes Latinos from the racial categories and assigns them to a separate category. Hispanics/Latinos may be of any race.
Race / Ethnicity (NH = Non-Hispanic)	Pop 2000	Pop 2010	Pop 2020	% 2000	% 2010	% 2020
White alone (NH)	52	41	37	52.00%	56.16%	52.11%
Black or African American alone (NH)	10	7	0	10.00%	9.59%	0.00%
Native American or Alaska Native alone (NH)	0	0	0	0.00%	0.00%	0.00%
Asian alone (NH)	0	0	0	0.00%	0.00%	0.00%
Native Hawaiian or Pacific Islander alone (NH)	0	0	0	0.00%	0.00%	0.00%
Other race alone (NH)	0	0	0	0.00%	0.00%	0.00%
Mixed race or Multiracial (NH)	0	0	3	0.00%	0.00%	4.23%
Hispanic or Latino (any race)	38	25	31	38.00%	34.25%	43.66%
Total	100	73	71	100.00%	100.00%	100.00%

=== 2000 census ===
As of the census of 2000, there were 100 people, 38 households, and 31 families residing in the CDP. The population density was 51.0 inhabitants per square mile (19.7/km^{2}). There were 49 housing units at an average density of 25.0 per square mile (9.7/km^{2}). The racial makeup of the CDP was 72.00% White, 10.00% African American, 18.00% from other races. Hispanic or Latino of any race were 38.00% of the population.

There were 38 households, out of which 39.5% had children under the age of 18 living with them, 55.3% were married couples living together, 18.4% had a female householder with no husband present, and 15.8% were non-families. 15.8% of all households were made up of individuals, and 7.9% had someone living alone who was 65 years of age or older. The average household size was 2.63 and the average family size was 2.84.

In the CDP, the population was spread out, with 28.0% under the age of 18, 15.0% from 18 to 24, 32.0% from 25 to 44, 15.0% from 45 to 64, and 10.0% who were 65 years of age or older. The median age was 29 years. For every 100 females, there were 81.8 males. For every 100 females age 18 and over, there were 94.6 males.

The median income for a household in the CDP was $36,250, and the median income for a family was $36,875. Males had a median income of $23,750 versus $26,250 for females. The per capita income for the CDP was $11,917. There were 21.2% of families and 14.9% of the population living below the poverty line, including 12.8% of under eighteens and none of those over 64.

== Education ==
On July 1, 2006, Spade Independent School District, which formerly served Spade, merged with Olton ISD to form Olton ISD. The consolidation of the school was featured in a segment of Texas Country Reporter. The students invited Sherman Jones, a wounded Korean War veteran, to take part in the final graduation ceremony, as he had never graduated from the school.
