= Clinton Rosette =

American journalist

Clinton E. Rosette (c. April 1850 – July 24, 1909) was a prominent citizen of DeKalb, Illinois, during the 19th century. Rosette was closely associated with well-known men from the same city, such as Isaac Ellwood. He was the first editor of the newspaper in DeKalb, the Daily Chronicle, a newspaper whose first publisher was barbed wire inventor Joseph Glidden. Today, a middle school bears his name.

== Early life ==
Rosette was born about April 1850 in Paw Paw Township, Illinois, in southwestern DeKalb County. He was the son of William E. Rosette and Elizabeth Breese, the sixth of ten children. Clinton married Alfaretta C. LaClaire in DeKalb Co., Illinois on December 24, 1873. In 1875, he and Alfaretta moved to DeKalb. Once there they ran a small private school until 1879 or 1880. They had no children.

== The newspaper ==
In March 1879 Clinton Rosette took the helm of the new DeKalb newspaper, the Daily Chronicle, as the founding editor. In the paper's early years publisher D.W. Tyrrell sold the Chronicle to Joseph F. Glidden. Glidden, a barbed wire entrepreneur and farmer by trade, ran the paper with Rosette until October 1906, when Glidden died. After Glidden's death, Rosette assumed ownership of the J.F. Glidden Publishing Co. The paper became well known during its first three decades as a bastion of Democratic journalism. Its earliest slogan was "Democratic in all Things and Under all Circumstances." The publishing company was sold yet again in January 1909 to Edward J. Raymond and Frank W. Greenway, mostly because of Rosette's failing health.

== Death ==
Rosette died of Bright's disease on July 24, 1909, scarcely six months after selling the newspaper and publishing company to Greenway and Raymond. He was buried and is still interred at DeKalb's Fairview Cemetery.
