= Cociu Waterfall =

Coordinates: 44°55′06″N 22°27′53″E

The Cociu Waterfall (Romanian: Cascada Cociu, also: Cascada Cociului, Cascada Roșeț) is a waterfall near Băile Herculane, Caraș-Severin County, southwestern Romania. 120 m (390 ft) high, it is the highest waterfall of Romania, though not in a single drop. It is on the small stream Ogașu lui Roșeț, a tributary of the Cerna.
