= Isaac L. Ellwood =

American businessman (1833–1910)

- Born: Isaac Leonard Ellwood; August 3, 1833; Salt Springville, New York, US
- Died: September 11, 1910 (aged 77); DeKalb, Illinois, US
- Occupation(s): Rancher, businessman
- Known for: Pioneering of barbed wire
- Relatives: Reuben Ellwood (brother)

Isaac Leonard Ellwood (August 3, 1833 – September 11, 1910) was an American rancher, businessman and barbed wire entrepreneur.

== Early life ==
Ellwood was born in Salt Springville, New York. His first taste of business came as a young boy when he began selling sauerkraut. In 1851, Ellwood, like many others, headed west to the California Gold Rush. He was the brother of United States Representative Reuben Ellwood.

== DeKalb, Illinois ==
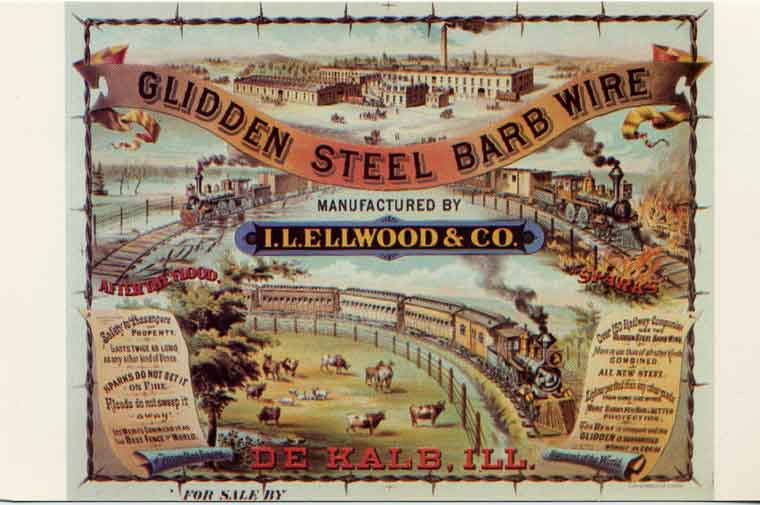
An advertising poster c. 1880s for Ellwood and Glidden's manufacturing firm.

Ellwood found some success in California and returned east in 1855, to DeKalb, Illinois, where he opened a hardware and implements store. On January 27, 1859, Ellwood married Harriet Augusta Miller; the couple would ultimately have seven children. As Ellwood rose to prominence he began acquiring farm properties in and around DeKalb, Illinois. After the Civil War ended he began to import Percheron draft horses, many from France. Eventually, this resulted in a 3,400-acre (14 km^{2}) stock farm near DeKalb.

=== Birth of barbed wire ===
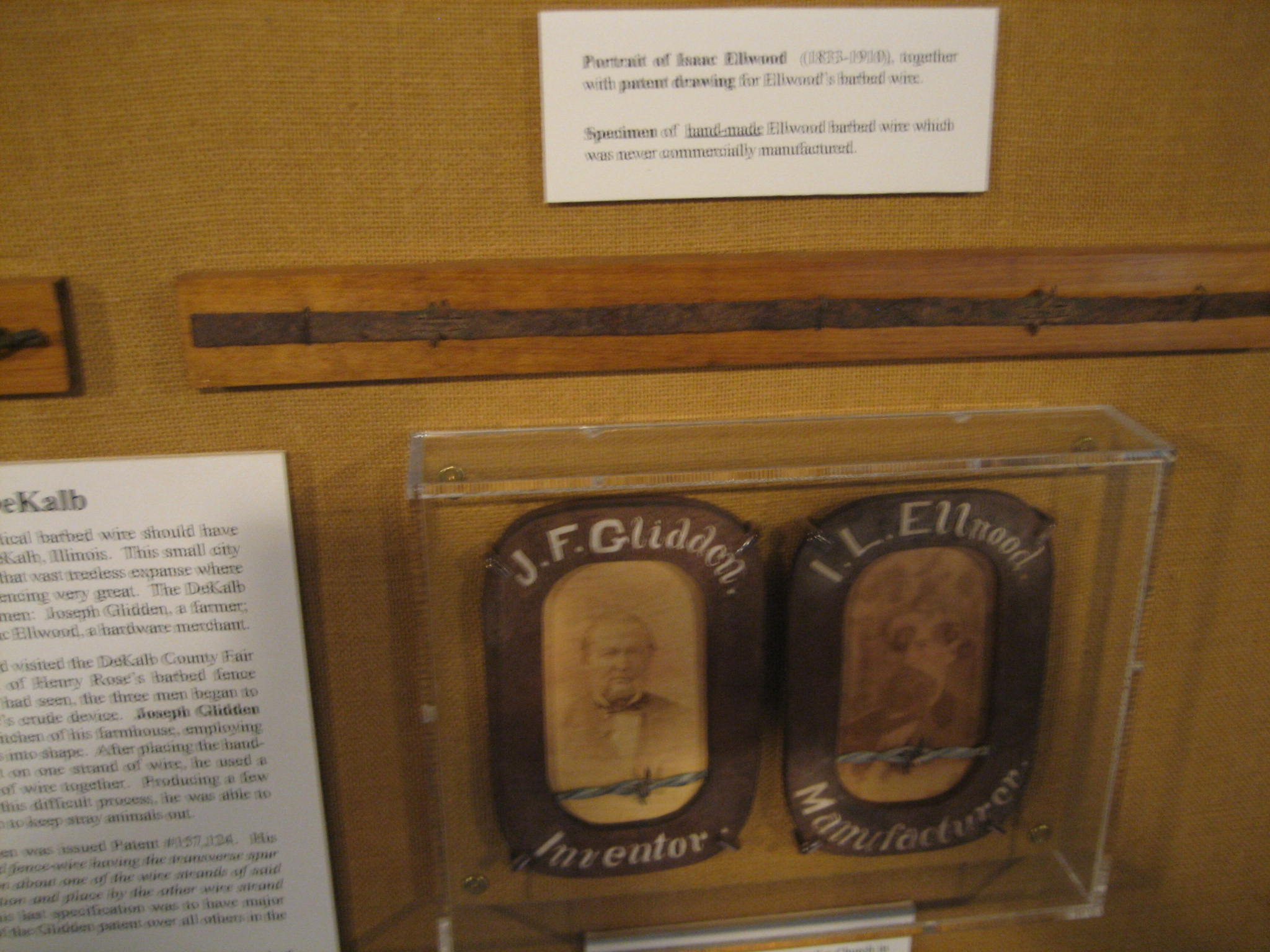
A specimen of Ellwood's hand made barbed wire, in the fashion of Glidden’s patent.

In late 1872, Waterman, Illinois farmer Henry Rose developed a wire fence with an attached wooden strip containing projecting wire points to dissuade encroaching livestock. He patented his fence in May, 1873 and exhibited it at the DeKalb County Fair that summer. This prompted Ellwood along with other DeKalb area residents Jacob Haish and Joseph Glidden to work on improving the concept. Ellwood patented a type of barbed wire in February 1874, but ever the businessman, concluded that Joseph Glidden's design was superior to his. He purchased one-half interest in Glidden's invention in July 1874. Glidden's patent issued in November, and together they formed the Barb Fence Company. In a few years, Glidden sold his half of that business to others, while retaining royalties from his patent.

Ellwood continued in the manufacture of barbed wire as Ellwood Manufacturing Company. In the beginning they produced two-strand, twisted barbed wire in the back of Ellwood's hardware store. The business was quickly successful. Ellwood's hiring of John Warne Gates as a salesman propelled sales of barbed wire in Texas.

Ranchers in the west found barbed wire fencing useful and much needed. As demand rose sharply, the company expanded, reorganized and merged and a successful Ellwood began construction on his Victorian mansion, the Ellwood House.

In 1881, Ellwood Manufacturing became Superior Barbed Wire Company under an expansion and reorganization plan. Seventeen years later the company would merge in the creation of John Warne Gates' American Steel and Wire monopoly, which was a predecessor of United States Steel.

=== Support for higher education ===
Ellwood played a major role in the history of Northern Illinois University. Clinton Rosette helped persuade Ellwood that the new Northern Illinois State Normal School should be in DeKalb. So convinced was Ellwood that he used all methods at his disposal to support the cause. His own capital, his time and his political influence were all used to gain DeKalb the new college.

Governor John Altgeld appointed Ellwood to the Board of Trustees, who were responsible for selecting a site for the normal school. This allowed him to assert all the more political influence. In the name of securing the future school for DeKalb Ellwood reportedly donated $20,000 and fronted another $50,000 in a non-interest bearing loan, along with 4.1 acres (17,000 m^{2}) of land for the new school. The bid was ultimately successful and the normal school eventually became NIU.

== Texas ranching ==
On a business trip to Texas in 1886, he purchased the 130,000 acre (530 km²) in Mitchell County from John and Dudley Snyder. In 1891, he purchased an additional 128,000 acres (518 km^{2}) northwest of Lubbock, Texas. He acquired more area in 1902 and 1906 bringing his total holdings in Texas to 265,000 acres (1,072 km^{2}). In all, at its height Spade Ranch and Ellwood's other Texas land holdings encompassed 395,000 acres (1,599 km^{2}).

Ellwood continued to acquire ranch land until almost the time he died, in Dekalb, Illinois, on September 11, 1910.

== Legacy ==
The borough of Ellwood City, Pennsylvania is named after Ellwood.
