= Rosanna (given name) =

- Gender: Female
- Language(s): English, Italian

Origin
- Derivation: Combination of the names Rose and Anna
- Meaning: Rose, Gracious rose

The name Rosanna /roʊˈzænə/ is the combination of Rosa (Rose) and Anna.

It should not be confused with Rossana, which is the Italian form of Roxana (see Roxanne).

== Variations ==
- Czech: Rozina, Rozárka
- Dutch: Roosanne, Rosan
- English: Rosanne, Rose Anna, Anne Rose
- French: Rosanne, Anne-Rose
- German: Rosanna
- Greek: Ροζάνα (Rozána)
- Italian: Rosanna
- Japanese: ロザンナ (Rozanna)
- Latin: Rosana
- Portuguese: Rosana, Rosane
- Russian: Розана (Rozana)
- Spanish: Rosa
- Swedish: Rosa, Rosanna

== People named Rosanna ==
- Rosanna Arquette, American actress, film director, and film producer
- Rosanna Davison, Irish socialite and model, and winner of the Miss World 2003 title
- Rosanna Li, Hong Kong artist and sculptor
- Rosanna Lockwood, British television journalist and host
- Rosanna Munter, Swedish pop singer
- Rosanna Norton, American costume designer
- Rosanna Pansino, American YouTube personality
- Rosanna Raymond (born 1967), New Zealand artist, poet, and cultural commentator
- Rosanna Sze, Olympic swimmer from Hong Kong
- Rosanna Tavarez, American singer, television personality, dancer, and teacher
- Dame Rosanna Wong, British-Hong Kong politician and social work administrator

== People named Rosana ==
See Rosana
