= Roxanna =

Roxanna may refer to:

- Roxanna, Ohio, US, an unincorporated community
- Roxanne (given name), a feminine given name
- Roxanna (crater), a crater on Venus

== See also ==
- Roxana (disambiguation)
- Roxanne (disambiguation)
- Rossana (disambiguation)
- Rosanna (disambiguation)
