= Roxy (given name) =

Roxy (alternatively Roxie or Roxey) is a given name or nickname, usually for Roxanne.

Notable people with the name include:

== People ==
- Roxey Ann Caplin (1793–1888), British writer and inventor
- Samuel Roxy Rothafel (1882–1936), New York City movie theater pioneer
- Roxy Beaudro (1884–1960), Canadian ice hockey player
- Roxie Lawson (1906–1977), American Major League Baseball pitcher and minor league manager
- Roxie Collie Laybourne (1910–2003), American ornithologist
- Roxie Joynes Campanella (1916–2004), American showgirl, philanthropist
- Roxie Roker (1929–1995), American actress
- Michael Roxy Roxborough (born 1951), American odds maker, syndicated columnist, teacher and author
- Roxy Paine (born 1966), American artist
- Roxy Bernstein (born 1972), American sportscaster
- Roxy Shahidi (born 1983), English actress
- Roxy Dorlas (born 1987), Dutch–Filipino footballer
- Roxy Yang (born 1989), a member of Formosa Dreamers

== Fictional characters ==
- Roxy, a fairy in the animated series Winx Club
- Roxy Astor, a female professional wrestler from the Gorgeous Ladies of Wrestling
- Roxy Balsom, in the soap opera One Life to Live
- Roxy Carmichael, in the film Welcome Home, Roxy Carmichael
- Roxy Harmon, in the film God Bless America
- Roxie Hart, in the play Chicago and its adaptations
- Roxy Harvey, in the TV series Dead Like Me
- Roxy Hunter, in four films (2007-2008)
- Roxy LeBlanc, in the TV series Army Wives
- Roxy Leech, a DC Comics character
- Roxie Marie, in the children's TV series Sesame Street
- Roxy Migurdia, in the light novel series Mushoku Tensei
- Roxy Miller, in the soap opera Home and Away
- Roxy Miller, in the film Eegah
- Roxy Mitchell, in the soap opera EastEnders
- Roxy Rocket, a DC Comics villain
- Roxy (Hannah Montana), in the TV series Hannah Montana
- Roxie (Pokémon), in the Pokémon universe
- Roxy Lalonde, in the webcomic Homestuck
- Roxanne "Roxy" Washington, a Marvel character known as Bling!
- Roxie Mcterrier, a character from Littlest Pet Shop: A World of Our Own
- Roxie, a camp counselor from the TV series Camp Cretaceous
- Roxy, in the animated TV series Mr. Bean
- Roxy, an alien poodle in The Adventures of Jimmy Neutron, Boy Genius
- Roxy, in the children's TV series Eureka!
- Roxy, in the TV series Pupstruction
- Roxy, a Merrie Melodies character who appears with Foxy

== See also ==
- Roxy (disambiguation)
- Roxanne (disambiguation)
