= Roxana (disambiguation) =

Roxana (4th century BC) was a Bactrian noble and a wife of Alexander the Great. The name has a variety of spellings in different languages, including Roxana or Roxanna or Rukhsana or Ruqsana.

Roxana or Roxanna or Rukhsana or Ruqsana may also refer to:

== Places in the United States ==
- Roxana, Alabama, an unincorporated community
- Roxana, Delaware, an unincorporated community
- Roxana, Georgia, an unincorporated community
- Roxana, Illinois, a village
- Roxana, neighborhood in East Chicago, Lake County, Indiana
- Roxana, Kentucky, an unincorporated community

== Other ==
- Olethreutes or Roxana, a tortrix moth genus
- Roxana: The Fortunate Mistress, a 1724 novel by Daniel Defoe
- Roxana, the Beauty of Montenegro, an 1878 ballet by Marius Petipa
- Rukhsana, a 1955 Indian Hindi language film

== People with the given name ==
=== Roxana/Roxanna ===
- Roxana Bârcă
- Roxana Briban
- Roxana Cocoș
- Roxana Cogianu
- Roxana Condurache
- Roxana Dumitrescu
- Roxana Han
- Roxana Luca
- Roxana Mărăcineanu
- Roxana Popa
- Roxana Saberi
- Roxana Yunussova
- Roxana Zal

=== Ruksana/Rukhsana/Rukhshana ===
- Rukhsana Ahmad
- Rukhsana Bangash
- Rukhsar Dhillon
- Rukhsana Jamshed Buttar
- Rukhsana Kausar
- Rukhsana Khan
- Rukhsana Kokab
- Rukhsana Noor
- Ruksana Osman
- Rukhsar Rehman
- Rukhsana Sultana
- Rukshana Tabassum

=== Ruqsana ===
- Ruqsana Begum

== See also ==
- Roxane (disambiguation)
- Roxanna (disambiguation)
- Roxanne (disambiguation)
- Roksana, a female given name
- Roshanak, a female given name
- Oksana, a female given name
