= Roxy Theatre =

Roxy Theatre, Roxy Theater, Roxie Theatre, or Roxie Theater may refer to:

== Australia ==
- Roxy Theatre (Warner Bros. Movie World), a movie theatre within Warner Bros. Movie World, Queensland
- Roxy Community Theatre in Leeton, New South Wales, originally called the Roxy Theatre
- Roxy Theatre and Peters Greek Cafe Complex in Bingara, New South Wales
- Roxy Theatre, Parramatta, a heritage-listed theatre in Parramatta, Sydney, New South Wales
- Roxy Theatre, Sydney, became Mayfair Theatre in 1932

== Canada ==
- Roxy Theatre (Edmonton), Alberta
- Roxy Theatre (Saskatoon), Saskatchewan
- Roxy Theatre (Toronto), Ontario, operated 1935-2006
- Roxy Theatre, in Neepawa, Manitoba
- The Roxy, part of the Granville Entertainment District in Vancouver, British Columbia

== United States ==
- Roxie Theater, 1909 movie theater in San Francisco, California
- Roxie Theatre, Los Angeles, California
- Roxy Theatre (West Hollywood, California)
- Roxy Theater (Miami Beach), Florida
- Roxy Theatre (Atlanta), Georgia
- Roxy Theatre (New York City), not to be confused with the RKO Roxy Theatre, now known as the Center Theatre
- RKO Roxy Theatre in Rockefeller Center, New York City, former name of the Center Theatre
- Roxy Theatre (Langdon, North Dakota), listed on the National Register of Historic Places
- Roxy Theatre (Clarksville, Tennessee)
- Roxy Theatre (Renton), Washington
- Surf Theatre, Huntington Beach, California; previously known as the Roxy Theatre

== See also ==
- Roxy (disambiguation)
