= Sargentini =

Sargentini is an Italian surname. Notable people with the surname include:

- Judith Sargentini (born 1974), Dutch politician
- Luisa Spagnoli (née Sargentini; 1877–1935), Italian entrepreneur
