= Roseanne (disambiguation) =

Roseanne is an American television sitcom that aired from 1988 to 1997 and was revived in 2018.

Roseanne may also refer to:

== People ==
- Roseanne (name), a female given name
- Roseanne Barr (born 1952), an American actress, comedian and producer eponymous to the sitcom series

== Television ==
- The Roseanne Show, an American talk show hosted by the actress that aired from 1998 to 2000
- The Real Roseanne Show, an American reality show surrounding the actress that aired in 2003
- Roseanne's Nuts, an American reality show surrounding the actress that aired in 2011
- Roseanne Conner, Barr's character on the eponymous sitcom.

== Music ==
- "Roseanne" (song), 1975 song by The Guess Who from their album Power in the Music

== Books ==
- Rosanne; or A Father’s Labour Lost, 1814 book by Laetitia Matilda Hawkins

== Places ==
- Roseann, Virginia, unincorporated community in the United States
