= Roseanna =

Roseanna may refer to:

== People ==
- Roseanna Bourke, New Zealand academic and psychologist
- Roseanna Brown, English singer and actress
- Roseanna Cunningham, Scottish politician
- Roseanna Neupauer, American civil engineer
- RoseAnna Schick, Canadian entertainment publicist
- Roseanna Vitro, American jazz singer and educator

== Media ==
- Roseanna (novel), by Sjöwall and Wahlöö, the first novel in their detective series revolving around Martin Beck and his team
  - Roseanna (1967 film), a Swedish film directed by Hans Abramson
  - Roseanna (1993 film), a Swedish film directed by Daniel Alfredson
- Roseanna's Grave, a 1997 American romantic comedy-drama film
- Roseanna McCoy, a 1949 American drama film directed by Irving Reis

== See also ==
- Roseanne (name)
- Rosanna (disambiguation)
- Roxana (disambiguation)
