= Rosanna =

Rosanna may refer to:

- Rosanna (given name)
- "Rosanna" (song), a 1982 song by Toto
- "Rosanna", a song by Gordon Lightfoot from the album The Way I Feel
- Rosanna (film), a 1953 Mexican film
- Rosanna, Victoria, a suburb of Melbourne
  - Rosanna railway station
- Rosanna, a community in the township of Norwich, Ontario, Canada
- Rosanna (river), a river in Tyrol, Austria
- Rosanna, a New Zealand Company ship that in 1826 explored suitable sites for settlements in New Zealand

== See also ==
- Rosana (disambiguation)
- Rossana (disambiguation)
- Roseanna (disambiguation)
- Roseanne (name)
