= Roxelana (given name) =

Roxelana, was the chief consort and legal wife of Ottoman sultan Suleiman the Magnificent

Roxelana, Roxolana, Roksolana may also refer to:

- Roksolana Kravchuk (born 1997), Ukrainian footballer
- Roksolana Pidlasa (born 1994), Ukrainian politician and economist
- Roxolana Roslak (born 1940), Ukrainian-Canadian soprano singer.
- Roxolana (singer) (born 1997), Ukrainian singer

== See also ==
- Roksana
- Roxolani
