= Rosana =

Rosana may refer to:

- Rosana (given name), a given name
- Rosana (footballer) (born 1982), a women's association footballer
- Rosanah Fienngo (born 1954), Brazilian singer popularly known as Rosana
- Rosana, São Paulo, a municipality in the state of São Paulo, Brazil
  - Campus Experimental de Rosana, the São Paulo State University campus in Rosana
- "Rosana" (song), a 2012 song by American rapper Wax

== See also ==
- Rosanna (disambiguation)
- Roseanne (name)
- Rosas (surname), of which Rosana is a spelling variation
