= Rossana =

Rossana may refer to:

- Rossana (given name), a feminine Italian given name
- Rossana, Piedmont, Italy
- Rossana (film), a Mexican drama film directed by Emilio Fernández
- Rossana (candy), Italian candy producted since 1926

== See also ==
- Rossana Lower and Rossana Upper, townlands of County Wicklow
- Rosanna (disambiguation)
- Rossano (disambiguation)
- Roxanna (disambiguation)
