= Programa Xuxa =

- Genre: Game show Music; Talk show
- Directed by: Marlene Mattos
- Presented by: Xuxa Meneghel
- Country of origin: Brazil
- Original language: Portuguese
- No. of seasons: 1

Production
- Running time: 1 hours

Original release
- Network: Rede Globo
- Release: 2 May – 24 October 1993

Related
- Paradão da Xuxa; Xuxa Park

Programa Xuxa (or simply Xuxa) is a Brazilian television show hosted by Xuxa Meneghel at TV Globo from 2 May to 24 October 1993, at 2pm on Sundays.

With Marlene Mattos's general directorate, five blocks and an hour long, the new program of the host brought jokes and scoundrels, gathering parents and children, presenting musical numbers and showing a table of interviews.

== Concept ==
Aimed at the whole family, initially the program would be monthly due to the accumulation of professional commitments in the agenda of Xuxa Meneghel. The attraction bearing the host's name was displayed on Sundays before Domingão do Faustão. Among the prominent figures were X of the Problem, which addressed topics related to adolescents and involved expert advice, and Pyramid, in which famous adults paired with children in the auditorium to guess words. With each hit, the pair advanced a little to the top and thus win the prize - a sum of money.

Every week the program gained new cadres. The Mela-Mela, in which the child received a surprise bath and had to guess what had fallen on his head (water, paint, honey or flower petals), was considered one of the most fun of the program. Another table in which the participant was smeared from head to foot, Stepping on the Tomato, also amused the audience: the child had to guess, blindfolded, on what was walking. All the jokes gave cash prizes. Xuxa made room for anonymous people through the Minute of Fame, in which anyone could be interviewed by the host. The program launched the "An Idea to Heal the World" promotion: children ages 5 to 10 could participate by sending phrases and drawings to production. The winner received as a prize a week in Los Angeles with escort, and a visit to the ranch of singer Michael Jackson.

== Scenery ==
The scenery of Xuxa resembled a street, with an iron bridge in the background and the stylized silhouette of a city. People could walk on the bridge, pacing the stage. Some of the scenographic constructions served for Xuxa to play. On the stage there was also a stage, with a transparent panoramic elevator in the center, used by the queen of the little ones to make their entry into the program.

== Cancellation ==
Xuxa was displeased presenting the program, believing that format was not ideal for her. There were also tensions between Xuxa and the writer of program, Rosana Hermann. In September 1993, Xuxa was forced to reduce the amount of commitments due to a problem in the column, thus causing the program to be canceled.
