= Roxy =

Roxy, Roxey, and Roxie may refer to:

== Music ==
- Roxy Recordings, a Swedish record label
- ROXi, a streaming music service

=== Bands ===
- Roxy Music, the British glam rock band
- Roxy, a band that included Bob Segarini, released just one album in 1970

=== Songs ===
- "Roxy", a 1998 song by Girls Against Boys
- "Roxy", a 2002 song by Concrete Blonde

== Theaters, nightclubs and venues ==
- Coca-Cola Roxy, a concert venue in Cumberland, Georgia
- Roxy Theatre (disambiguation), the name of several places
- The Roxy (Covent Garden), a nightclub in London, now closed
- The Roxy (New York City), a nightclub on West 18th Street in New York City, now closed
- The Roxy, former name (until 2008) of the Buckhead Theatre in Atlanta, Georgia

== Places ==
- Roxie, Mississippi, U.S.
- Roxy Square, a public square and neighborhood in Heliopolis, Cairo, Egypt

== Other uses ==
- Roxie (TV series), a 1987 American television sitcom starring Andrea Martin
- Roxy (cigarette), a Dutch brand
- Roxy (film), a 2018 Canadian teen romantic comedy film
- Roxy (given name), including a list of people and characters with the name
- Roxy (clothing), a brand of Quiksilver women's surf-inspired apparel formed in 1990
- The Roxy (Portland, Oregon), a restaurant
- The Roxy (TV series), a short-lived show featuring UK music chart hits and bands

== See also ==
- Roxy Hotel (disambiguation), the name of several places
- Roxanne (disambiguation)
- Roxette, BizArt
- Roxxxy, a sex robot
- Roxxxy Andrews, an American drag performer
- Oxycodone, or Roxicodone or dihydrohydroxycodeinone, a semi-synthetic opioid
