= Roxy Hotel =

Roxy Hotel may refer to the following hotels:

- Roxy Hotel (Cape Vincent), New York, U.S.
- Roxy Hotel, Katong Shopping Centre, Singapore
- Roxy Hotel, formerly based in the Roxy Theatre, Parramatta, Australia
