= Roxane =

Roxane may be:

- Another spelling of the female given name Roxanne
- Roxane, a brand name of the drug roxatidine
- 317 Roxane, an asteroid
- Roxana, wife of Alexander the Great
- Roxane, the lover of Cyrano de Bergerac
- Roxane (sailing boat), a 30 ft lugger yacht, designed by Nigel Irens

== See also ==
- Roxanne (disambiguation)
- Roxan
- Roksan
