= Rosana (given name) =

Rosana is a given name.

Notable people with the name include:

- Rosana Arbelo (born 1963), Spanish singer and composer
- Rosana Bertone (born 1972), Argentine politician
- Rosana Castrillo Diaz (born 1971), Spanish artist
- Rosana Chouteau, Native American clan leader
- Rosana Favila (born 1964), Brazilian rhythmic gymnast
- Rosana Franco (born 1970), Mexican sportscaster
- Rosana Gómez (born 1980), Argentine footballer
- Rosana Hermann (born 1957), Brazilian writer and television host
- Rosana Kiroska (born 1991), Macedonian skier
- Rosana Pastor (born 1960), Spanish politician and actor
- Rosana Paulino (born 1967), Brazilian visual artist, educator and curator
- Rosana dos Santos Augusto (born 1982), Brazilian footballer
- Rosana Serrano (born 1998), Cuban rower
- Rosana Simón (born 1989), Spanish taekwondo practitioner
- Rosana Tositrakul (born 1957), Thai politician
- Rosana Ubanell (born 1958), Spanish novelist
- Rosana Valle (born 1969), Brazilian politician
- Rosana Zegarra, American rower
