= Burnie Theatre =

Former theatre in Burnie, Tasmania

- Town Hall Theatre, Burnie Theatre Star
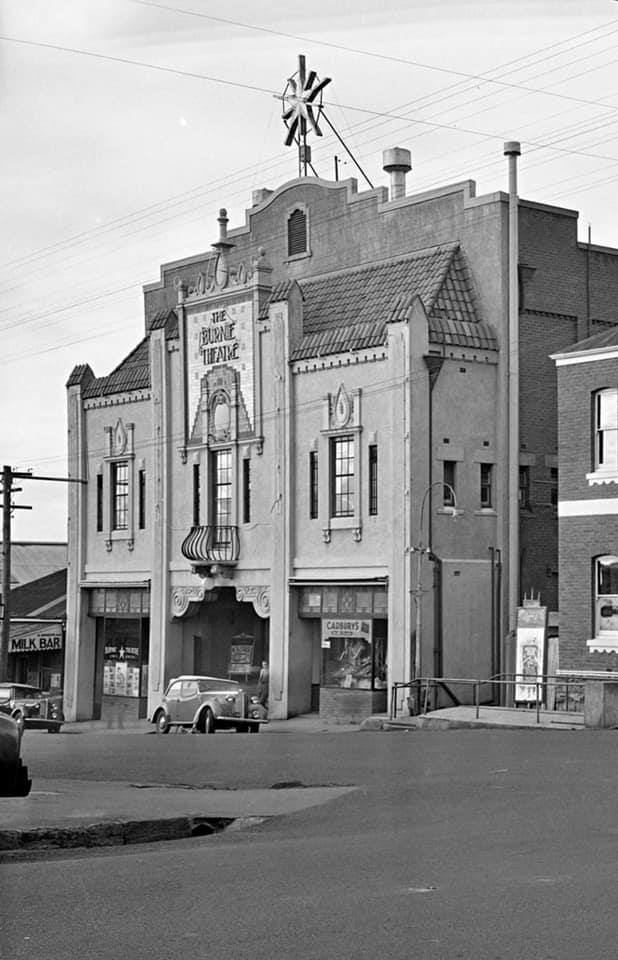
- Burnie Theatre in the 1950s
- Interactive map of Burnie Theatre
- Address: 39-41 Mount Street; Burnie, Tasmania; Australia
- Coordinates: 41°3′7.03″S 145°54′19.71″E
- Capacity: 1,500

Construction
- Opened: 1879
- Closed: 1976
- Architect: Frank Heyward (1931)

The Burnie Theatre was a historic theatre in Burnie, Tasmania, Australia. The theatre, adjoining town hall, Burnie Institute and Public Library were all converted into a large FitzGerald's department store by 1978 and completely demolished in 2009.

== History ==
In 1879, a small town hall was built on the intersection of Mount Street and Cattley Street. When a larger town hall building was erected next door, the original hall was converted into the larger hall's stage area, opening as the Town Hall Theatre in 1888. A second story was constructed was in 1908 and by 1913 the Emu Bay Council was operating the live performance space as the Burnie Theatre, although it was often referred to as the "Municipal Theatre" or "Civic Theatre" in print to create separation between the theatre and the township's namesake. The theatre was screening silent movies by 1918 and on 31 December 1929 screened its first talkie, The Broadway Melody.

=== Frank Heyward renovations ===
On the cusp of the Great Depression in Australia, cinematic amusements including the screening of newsreels became increasingly popular. The Emu Bay Council hired renown Launceston architect Frank Heyward to renovate and expand the premises in 1929.

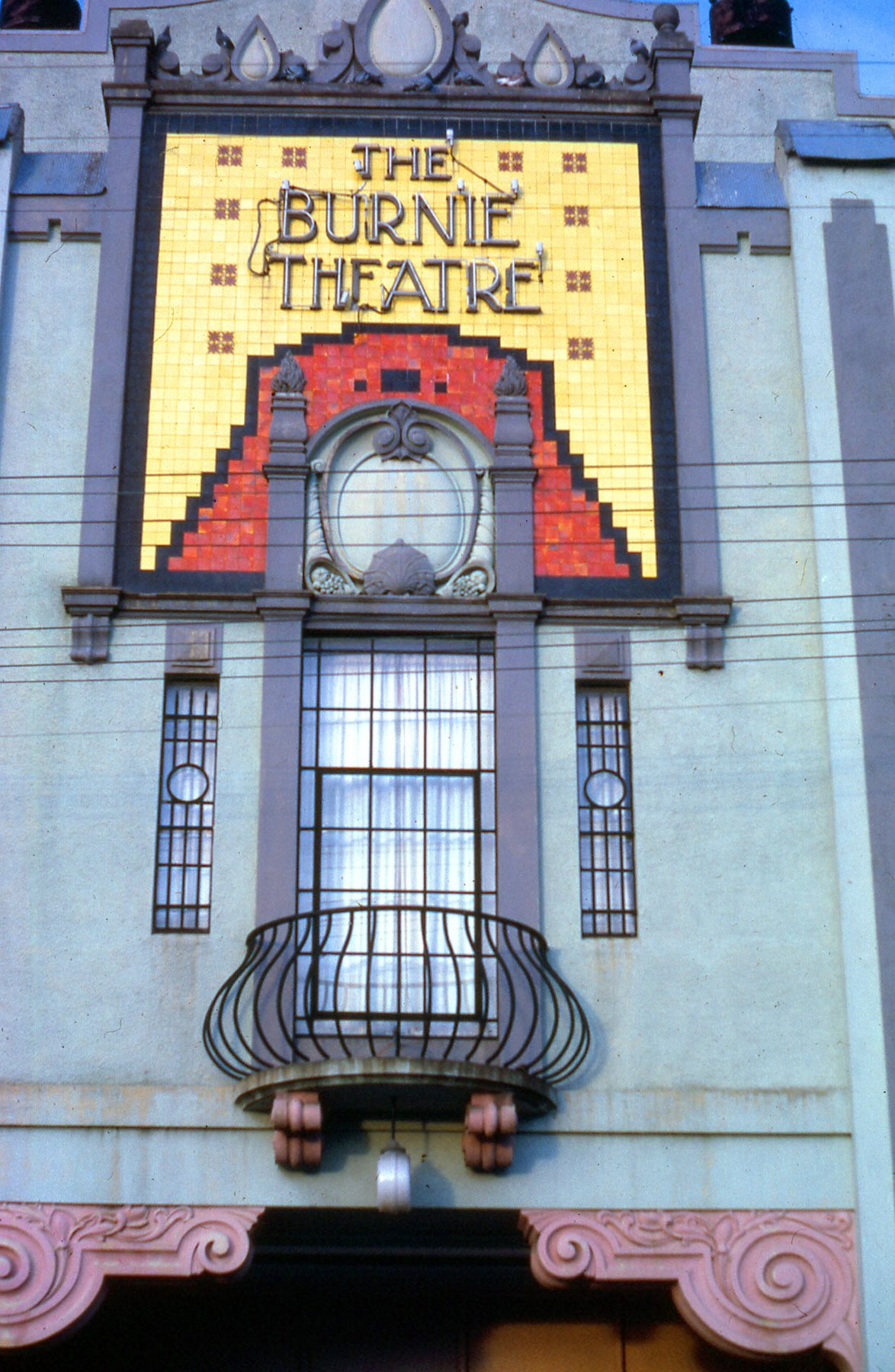
Burnie Theatre façade showcasing neon signage, decorative tiling and wrought-iron balconet in 1966

The theatre underwent massive renovations in January 1931, which saw all cinema screenings transferred to the adjoining Town Hall. At a cost of £A10,000, the theatre reopened in a Spanish Colonial Revival style on 5 September 1931 with seating for 1,500 patrons. The façade included patterned tiling, wrought-iron features, decorative parapet, two new shopfronts and the erection of neon signage. Interiors included lead-light windows, wood-carved banisters, Wunderlich ceilings and advanced atmospheric lighting. The design was constructed from all-Australian materials, then standard practice in municipal works. The renovations also included upstairs gallery and improved internal access to the Town Hall. The council held a separate tender for the construction of a concrete and steel projection box to best contain the further spread of nitrate film fires.

The reopening production was Tom Walls' Rookery Nook and the building became colloquially referred to as the "New Burnie Theatre". A private screening of the pre-code film The Divorcee starring Norma Shearer screened that year.

In spite of considerable industrial growth in Burnie in the 1920s, the Great Depression hit Tasmania particularly hard, seeing 28% of trade unionists without work in 1931. Theatre patronage remained strong as people sought relief in cinema, live theatre and newsreels. The theatre, now the largest on Tasmania's North Coast, established an amateur theatre company, the Little Players, and began attracting bigger touring acts, including Russian pianist Mark Hambourg, operatic singer Peter Dawson and comedian Joe Lawman.

In May 1936, the name was changed to Burnie Theatre Star. The theatre was used for cinema screenings, travelling theatre productions, ballet, wrestling, amateur theatre, dancing and inter-school events. The venue hosted performances by Russian pianist Jascha Spivakovsky, Viennese pianist Paul Badura-Skoda and Chinese opera singer Yi-Kwei Sze in 1953. Hungarian pianist Béla Síki visited the theatre in 1954.

=== Live entertainment venue ===
In 1953, operator R.A. Hamilton founded Star Theatres Pty Ltd and by 1955, the company had formed a monopoly on entertainment venues in Burnie. Operating both the Burnie Theatre and the nearby Vogue Theatre, Star Theatres Pty Ltd constructed a second "Star" picture theatre at 69 Mount Street. Designed by Sydney architects Click & Perry, the modern Star Theatre entered direct competition with the original Burnie Theatre, eventually causing its closure in 1965, with the new Star Theatre becoming the sole picture theatre in Burnie. The council-owned theatre reverted to the Burnie Theatre namesake and began utilising the space for popular music artists touring throughout the 1960s-70s, including AC/DC, John Farnham, Charlie Pride, Roy Orbison, Winifred Atwell, MPD Ltd, Tony Barber, Peter Doyle, Normie Rowe, Zoot, Jade Hurley, Col Joye and Little Pattie.

=== Decline ===
After many years of intermittent usage, the council sold the Burnie Theatre, adjoining Town Hall, Burnie Institute and Public Library to FitzGerald's Department Stores in 1976. The new Civic Centre Theatre began construction that same year. The Coastal Players, an acting group containing members from nearly every township along the North Coast performed Stephen Sondheim's musical A Funny Thing Happened on the Way to the Forum. The production was intended to be the opening performance at the Burnie Civic Centre Theatre, however due to ongoing delays in construction, it became both the final performance at the Burnie Theatre, and the debut of the new. The Burnie Theatre, along with the surrounding buildings purchased by FitzGerald's Department Stores were all severely altered to meet the requirements of the department store. Although sections of the theatre and the Town Hall building dated back to 1879, all of the buildings were completely demolished without public protest in 2009.

== Little Players ==
Established in the 1930s, the Little Players club was a council-supported theatre company based within the Burnie Theatre that operated until the 1960s. It eventually evolved into the Burnie Musical Society.

== Legacy ==
The Burnie Theatre was the largest example of civic architecture in the Spanish Colonial Revival style in Tasmania.

== See also ==
- List of theatres in Hobart
- Roxy Theatre, Parramatta
