= Roksana =

Roksana is a female given name. Roksana is the name of:

- Roksana Babajan (born 1946), Soviet/Russian pop singer
- Roksana Bahramitash a Canadian sociologist of Iranian background
- Roksana Ciurysek-Gedir
- Roksana Yasmin Suty, Bangladeshi politician
- Roksana Jonek (born 1978), Polish model and businesswoman
- Roksana Khudoyarova (born 2001), Uzbekistani triple jumper
- Roksana Tymchenko (birth 1991), a Ukrainian alpine skier
- Roksana Węgiel, a Polish singer who won the Junior Eurovision Song Contest 2018
- Roksana Zasina (born 1988), Polish freestyle wrestler
- Kaniz Fatema Roksana (died 1984), first Bangladeshi woman commercial pilot

== See also ==
- Ruksana (disambiguation)
- Ruksana Begum
