= Perugina =

Italian confectionery company

- Type: Subsidiary
- Industry: Confectionery food
- Founded: 1907; 119 years ago
- Founder: Luisa and Annibale Spagnoli; Francesco Andreani; Francesco Buitoni; Leone Ascoli
- Headquarters: Perugia, Italy
- Products: Chocolate
- Number of employees: 613 (2019)
- Parent: Nestlé
- Website: www.perugina.it

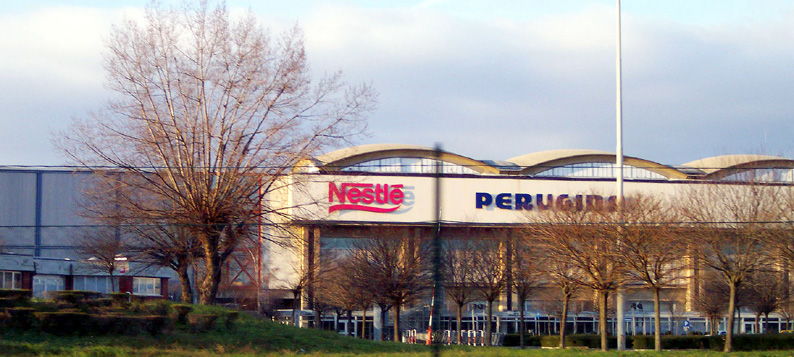
Nestlé-Perugina in Perugia, Italy

Perugina is an Italian chocolate confectionery company based in Perugia, Italy that was founded in 1907. The company also operates a chocolate-making school at its factory in Perugia, which commenced in 2007. Perugina was purchased by and became a division of the Nestlé corporation in 1988.

Merged in 1968 with the family company of the same name to form the IBP-Industrie Buitoni Perugina group, it was involved in the crisis of the food sector of the seventies, from which it emerged in 1985 with the sale to Carlo De Benedetti 's CIR group; However, political maneuvers outside the group prevented the latter from consolidating its presence in the consumer food sector and, in 1988, IGP was sold to the Swiss multinational Nestlé which since 2008 has only held the Perugina brand, having sold Buitoni on that date.

Perugina's registered office has been in Milan since 1988, but the production plants and the Chocolate School are located in Perugia.

== History ==
The company was formed in 1907 by Francesco Buitoni, Annibale Spagnoli, Leone Ascoli and Francesco Andreani. It was founded in the town of Perugia, which is located in the Umbria region of central Italy. A great deal of Perugina's success is attributed to Luisa Spagnoli, who created the chocolate brand Perugina and played the paramount role in the chocolate factory setup and further development.

The company was introduced to the United States at the 1939 World's Fair in New York City, and since became known for producing fine chocolates. Perugina also opened a retail store on Fifth Avenue in New York City circa 1939.

== Products ==
The company produces a wide array of chocolate and food products, including chocolate bars, hard candy, nougat, and biscotti. During Easter-time, a major product is chocolate Easter eggs wrapped in colorful aluminium paper.

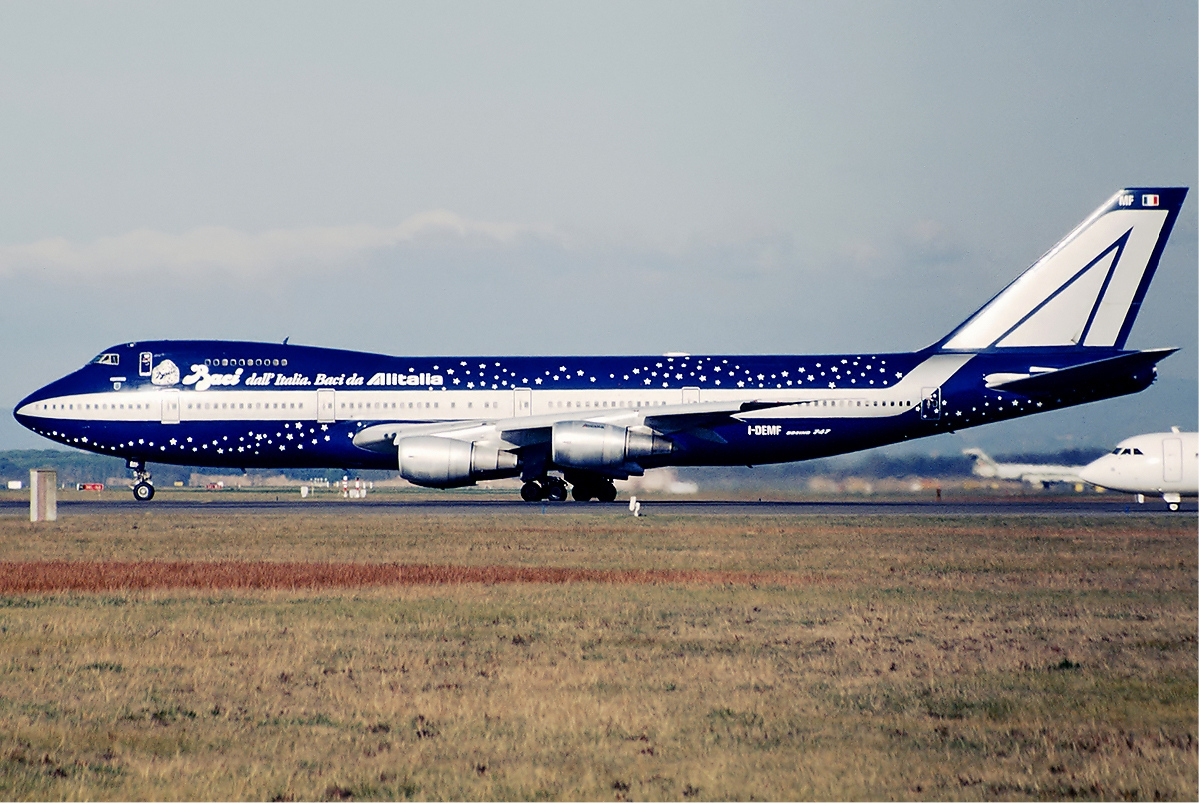
In the late 1990s, Alitalia painted one of its Boeing 747s in a special Baci livery.

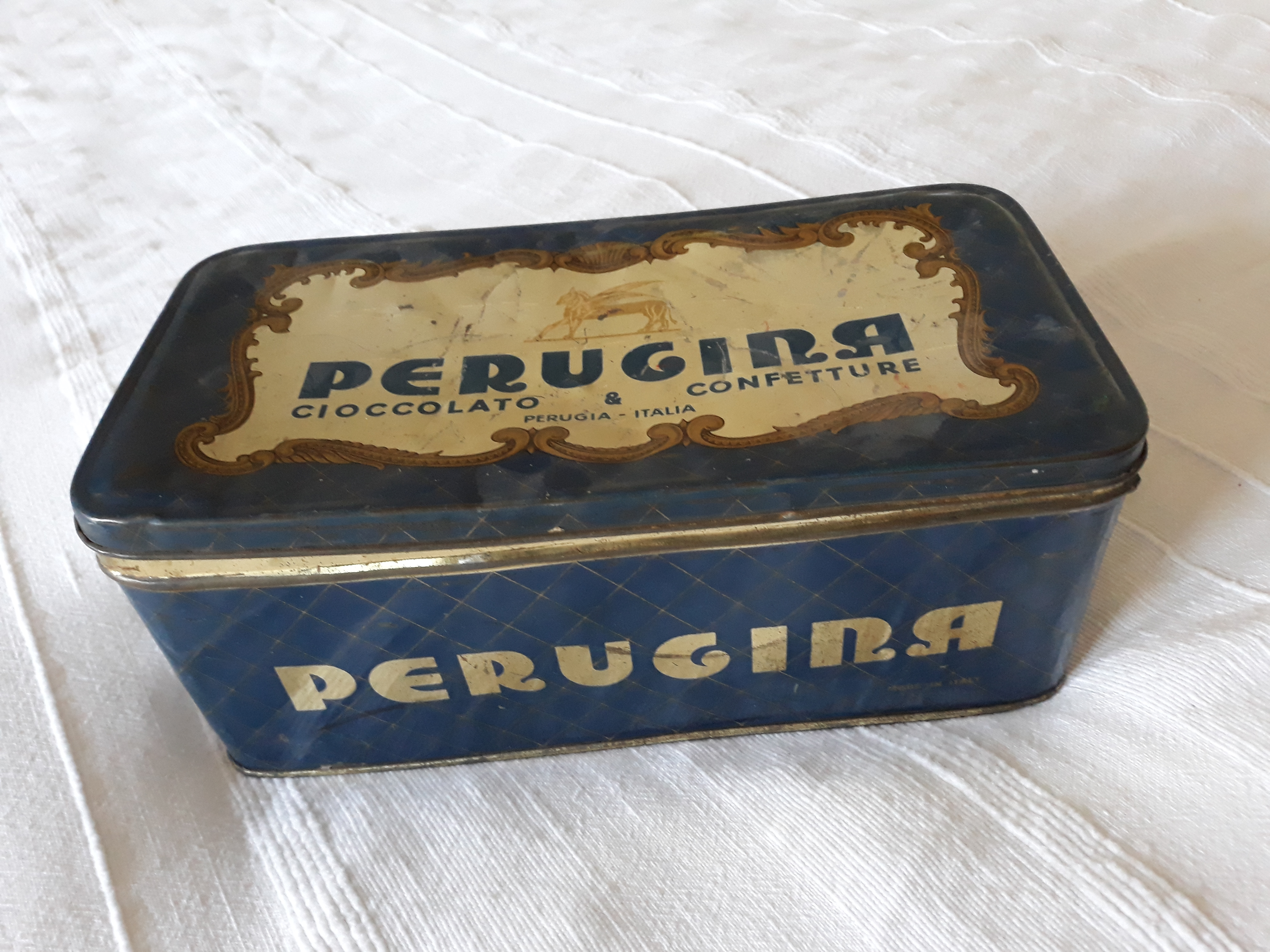
Perugina chocolate tin box (ca 1955)

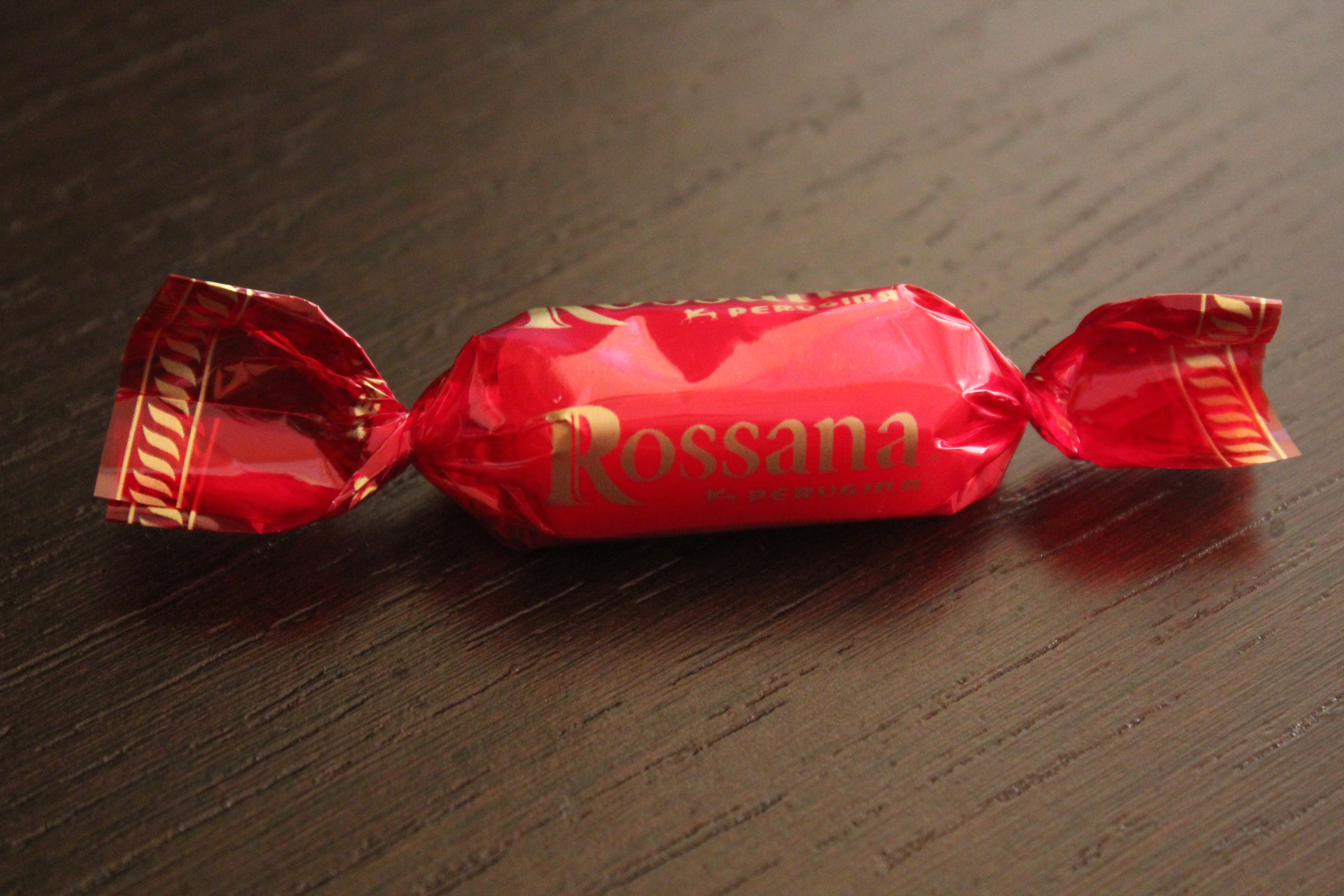
Rossana Perugina Candy

A noted and well-known product is the Baci chocolate kisses filled with hazelnut, wrapped in a multilingual love note, which was introduced in 1922. These love notes are written in either Italian, English, French, German, Greek, Spanish, or Portuguese.

== See also ==
- List of bean-to-bar chocolate manufacturers
