= Luisa Spagnoli =

Italian businesswoman (1877–1935)

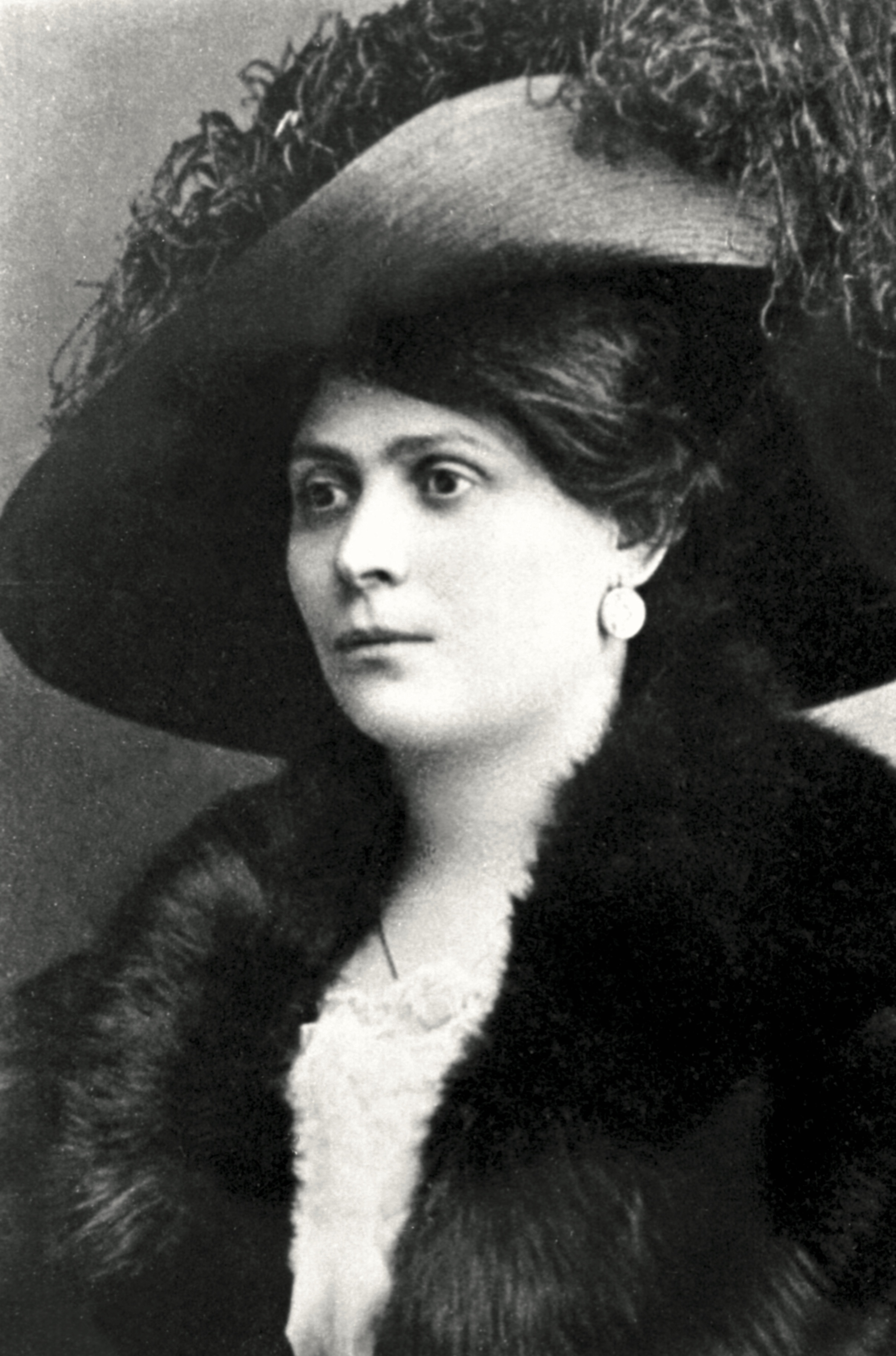
- Spagnoli in the 1900s
- Born: Luisa Sargentini; 30 October 1877; Perugia, Umbria, Kingdom of Italy
- Died: 21 September 1935 (aged 57); Saint-Maur-des-Fossés, Seine, French Republic
- Resting place: Santa Lucia, Perugia
- Occupations: Businesswoman; entrepreneur
- Organizations: Perugina; Angora Spagnoli
- Known for: Baci Perugina
- Spouse: Annibale Spagnoli (m. 1899)
- Children: 4
- Website: www.luisaspagnoli.com

Luisa Spagnoli (Italian pronunciation: [luˈiːza spaɲˈɲɔːli]; née Sargentini; 30 October 1877 – 21 September 1935) was an Italian businesswoman, famous for creating a women's clothing company and chocolate factories Perugina.

== Early life ==
Luisa Sargentini was born in Perugia to fishmonger Pasquale Sargentini and housewife Maria Lo Conte from Ariano Irpino. At the age of 21, she married Annibale Spagnoli, with whom she had three sons, Mario, Armando and Aldo, and a daughter, Maria. The couple acquired a grocery store and started the production of dragées.

== Business career ==
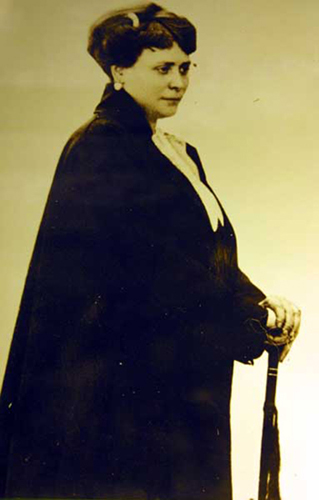
Spagnoli in her later years

=== Perugina ===
With Francesco Buitoni, Spagnoli founded the small company Perugina, headquartered in the historical center of her hometown of Perugia. Perugina initially began with 15 employees.

With the outbreak of World War I when men had to leave for the front, Spagnoli was left to carry on the business alone with her three children, including two sons Mario and Aldo, taking care of them all by herself. After the war, the Perugina factory grew to more than 100 employees.

In 1922, a brand of Italian chocolates called Baci ("Kisses") was created. The recipe for Baci now, nearly around 100 years since it was created, remains the same: dark chocolate, gianduia, chopped hazelnuts and crowned with a whole hazelnut.

By 1939, after her death, her chocolate brand Baci Perugina was so successful that it arrived in other countries including the US.

=== Angora Spagnoli ===
Logo of the Luisa Spagnoli fashion company

After the end of the war, Spagnoli created a new company, breeding poultry and angora rabbits.

In 1928, Spagnoli was the person to think of the idea of using angora yarn for knitwear including shawls, boleros, and fashionable garments which she trademarked Angora Spagnoli. At the Fiera di Milano exhibition, her innovation was showcased, and the activity of the company soon expanded.

== Death ==
Being diagnosed with throat cancer, Spagnoli was unable to witness the growth of her company, which began about four years later under the guidance of her son Mario. Giovanni Buitoni, Francesco's son, moved her to Paris to obtain the best available medical care, remaining with her until her death in nearby Saint-Maur-des-Fossés in 1935, a month before turning 58.

== Legacy ==
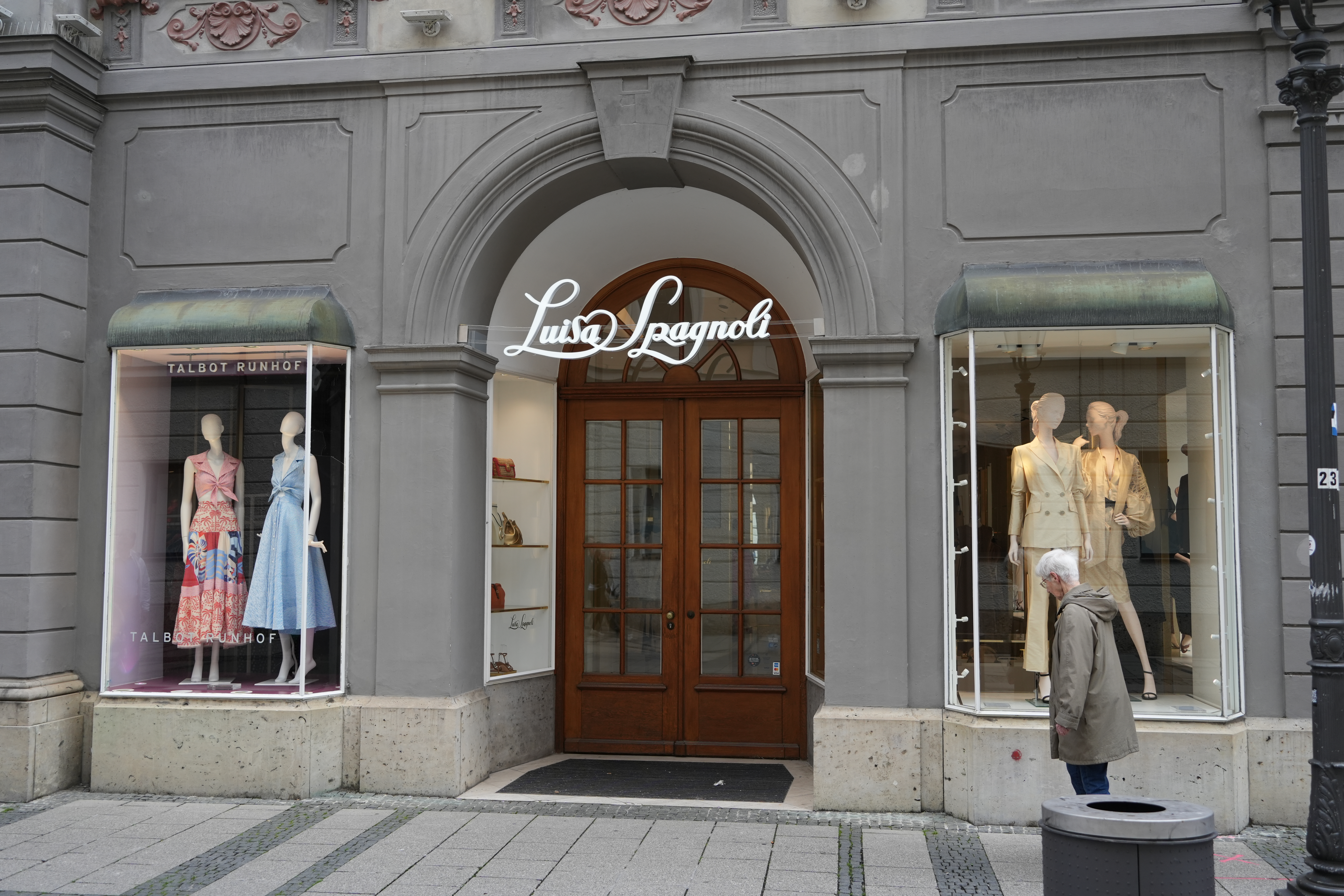
Luisa Spagnoli shop in Munich, 2025

Following her death, Spagnoli's son Mario (1900–1977) transitioned her company from fine crafts to a more industrialized focus in 1937. He was credited with the invention of a comb for collection of wool and a clamp for tattooing angora rabbits, which were patented in 1942.

In 1947, Mario built the Città dell'angora (Angora city) factory, located at the center of a growing community. In the 1960s, he also founded the playground of the Città della Domenica originally called Spagnolia, that remains a destination for visitors to this day.

Under the leadership of Mario's son Annibale "Lino" (1927–1986), entrepreneur and president of Perugia Calcio, production diversified and the family created the network of Luisa Spagnoli shops.

There are now more than 100 shops throughout the world, with the headquarters still based in Perugia.

== See also ==
- Rossana (candy)

== Sources ==
- Corvisieri, Valerio (2017). "SARGENTINI, Luisa". Dizionario Biografico degli Italiani (in Italian). Rome: Istituto dell'Enciclopedia Italiana. OCLC 883370.
- Grohmann, Alberto (1988). Perugia. Laterza. p. 159. ISBN 88-420-1877-5.
