= Surf Theatre =

Former movie theater in Huntington Beach, California

- Interactive map of Surf Theatre
- Former names: Scott's Theatre (1925–1937); Roxy Theatre (1937–1941)
- Address: 121 5th Street; Huntington Beach, California; United States
- Coordinates: 33°39′29″N 118°00′09″W

Construction
- Groundbreaking: January 24, 1925
- Opened: May 20, 1925; 101 years ago
- Closed: c. 1980s
- Demolished: 1989; 37 years ago
- Architect: M. Eugene Durfee

The Surf Theatre was a movie theater along the Pacific Coast Highway in Huntington Beach, California. It originally opened as Scott's Theatre in 1925 and later operated as the Roxy Theatre beginning in 1937. In 1941, the venue was renamed the Surf Theatre, an identity under which it became notable for its screening of surf films until its closure in the 1980s. The M. Eugene Durfee-designed Art Deco building was demolished in 1989.

== History ==
On January 24, 1925, construction began on a movie theater commissioned by J. C. Scott at 121 5th Street in Huntington Beach, California. Scott previously operated two theaters in Long Beach. J. D. Sherer of Long Beach served as general contractor on the project. The building cost US$16,000 to construct and total expenses exceeded $50,000. The venue, colloquially named the "Scott theater" after its owner, opened on May 20, 1925, with a ceremony attended by actress and local resident Mary Philbin as well as a delegation from the city's chamber of commerce.

On May 10, 1928, Scott's Theatre hosted a vaudeville show featuring the William Henry players and the Blue and Gold melody boys. It was the first instance of the venue hosting live theatre.

In 1937, Scott's Theatre was renamed to the Roxy Theatre. By June 1941, its name was changed to the Surf Theatre.

On June 27, 1944, the Surf Theatre hosted a Los Angeles War Finance Committee-sponsored set of special film screenings to promote the sale of war bonds for the American World War II effort. Purchase of a bond as part of the Fifth War Bond campaign was required for entry to the show.

With the emergence of surf film in the 1960s, the Surf Theatre became a popular venue for the genre. The theater regularly hosted screenings of surf documentaries such as Pacific Vibrations and Five Summer Stories that attracted large crowds of surfers. Theatergoers would "yell and hoot" when surfers in the films successfully surfed a wave.

The Surf Theatre closed in the 1980s. During a city revitalization project, the unused venue was demolished in 1989 and replaced with a parking lot.

== Architecture ==
M. Eugene Durfee, a prominent Orange County architect, designed the building in the Art Deco style. The brick building was 50 feet (15 m) wide and 107.5 feet (32.8 m) long. The original single-auditorium interior featured a "beam ceiling with panel tiffany finish" and included a stage.

== Revival ==
In 2002, Dave Carlos, a surfer who grew up attending movies at the Surf Theatre, rented a Mann Theatres location for $6,000 in an effort to revive the original theater's programming. Burning the Map, a documentary featuring a local surfer, was screened and was met with a sold-out crowd. Subsequent surf film screenings became a monthly occurrence thereafter.
