= Roxann =

Roxann is a feminine given name. Notable people with the name include:

- Roxann Dawson (born 1958), American actress, television producer and director
- Roxann Robinson (born 1956), American politician

== See also ==
- Roxanne (disambiguation)
