= Roxanne Franck =

French handball player (born 1998)

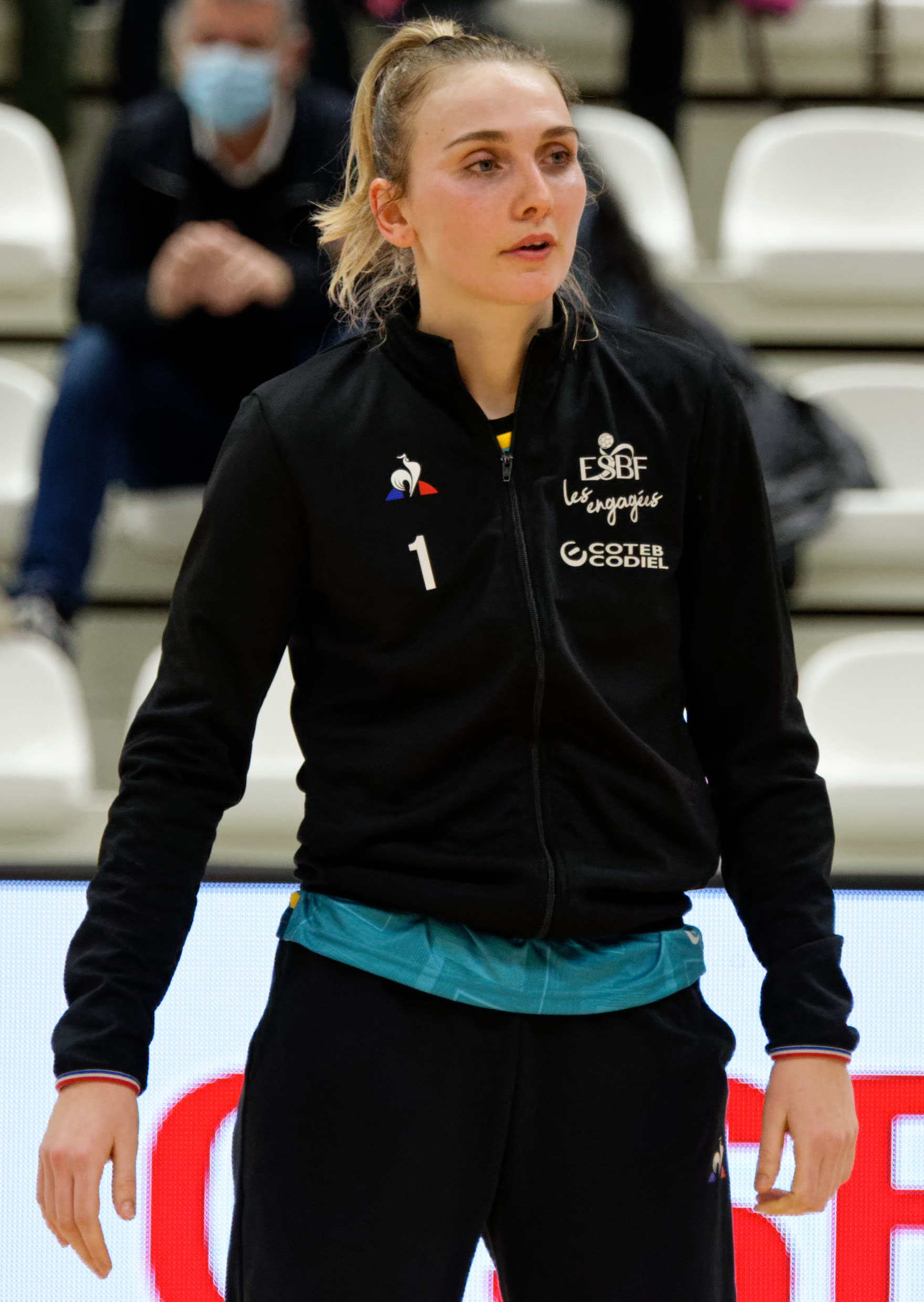
- Roxanne Frank (2022)

Personal information
- Nationality: French
- Born: 14 January 1998 (age 28) Mulhouse, France
- Height: 1.78 m (5 ft 10 in)

Sport
- Sport: Handball
- Position: Goalkeeper
- Current club: Paris 92
- Number: 1

Youth career
- Years: Team
- –2012: Soultz
- 2012–2014: Colmar
- 2014–2017: ATH
- 2017–2019: ES Besançon

Senior clubs
- Years: Team
- 2019–2022: ES Besançon
- 2022–: Paris 92
National team
| Years | Team | Apps | (Gls) |
| 2019– | France | 8 | (0) |
Medal record
Junior European Championship
| Gold medal – first place | 2017 Slovenia |
- Updated on 3 January 2022

Roxanne Franck (born 14 January 1998) is a French handball player who plays for Paris 92 and the France national team.

She was called up to the French national team for the first time in 2018 in preparation for the 2018 European Championship, but didn't play a match. She debuted for the French national team on 21 March 2019 against Romania.

== Achievements ==
- Junior European Championship:
  - Gold Medalist: 2017
