= Ruksana Osman =

- Scientific career
- Fields: Higher Education
- Institutions: University of the Witwatersrand

Ruksana Osman is Professor and Deputy Vice-Chancellor at the University of the Witwatersrand, Johannesburg, South Africa. Before then, she was the Dean of the Faculty of Humanities at the University of the Witwatersrand, Johannesburg, South Africa. She is also the former Head of the School of Education at the University of the Witwatersrand. She is an elected member of the Academy of Science, South Africa.

== Career ==
Osman's expertise is in Higher Education, Research Led Teacher Education and Teaching and Learning in Higher Education. Her focus is on equity, access and success in teacher and higher education. She has authored three books. She also serves as convenor of the UNESCO Research Chair in Teacher Education for Diversity and Development.
