= Roseanne (name) =

Roseanne, Rosanne, Roseann, or Rose Ann is a feminine given name. The name means “graceful rose” or “favored rose”, from Rose and Anne, meaning “grace” or “favored”.

It may refer to:

== People ==
- Roseanne Barr (b. 1952), also known by the mononym Roseanne, an American performer with several eponymous television shows.
- Rosanne Cash (b. 1955), American singer
- Roseanne A. Brown, Ghanaian American writer
- Rose-Anne Galligan (b. 1987), Irish athlete
- Rosanne Hertzberger (b. 1984), Dutch politician
- Roseanne Liang, Chinese-New Zealand film director
- Roseanne Park (b. 1997) Korean-New Zealander singer and member of the k-pop girl group Blackpink
- Roseann Quinn (1944–1973), American schoolteacher whose murder inspired the 1975 novel Looking for Mr. Goodbar and its 1977 film adaptation
- Roseann Runte (b. 1948), college professor and the President and Vice-Chancellor of Carleton University in Ottawa, Canada
- Rose Ann Scamardella (b. 1947), American journalist
- Roseanne Skoke (b. 1954), Liberal MP for the riding of Central Nova (Nova Scotia, Canada) from 1993 to 1997
- Roseanne Spaughton (b. 1990), English content creator and one half of the duo Rose and Rosie
- Roseanne Supernault, Canadian actress
- Roseanne Watt (b. 1991), Scottish poet, filmmaker and musician

== Fictional television characters ==
- Roseanne Conner, on the TV sitcom Roseanne
- Roseanne Roseannadanna, on the TV series Saturday Night Live
- Roseanne Delgado (formerly Vega), on the TV soap opera One Life to Live

== See also ==
- Roseanne (disambiguation)
- Roseanna (disambiguation)
- Rosie (disambiguation)
- Rose (given name)
- Roxanne (given name)
- Ann (name)
- Annie (given name)
