= Roksana Ciurysek-Gedir =

- Occupations: Banker; Artist; Film producer

Roksana Ciurysek-Gedir is a Polish-born banker, artist, and film producer. She was honoured as a Young Global Leader by the World Economic Forum in 2014 and is a recipient of the Newsweek Polska award (2008).

== Career ==
=== Finance ===
Ciurysek-Gedir started her career at European Bank for Reconstruction and Development in 1998. In 2005, Ciurysek-Gedir joined Merrill Lynch to work in both equity derivatives and fixed income. She joined JPMorgan in 2007, specializing in equity derivatives and advising London-based hedge funds. Subsequently, she joined the Edmond de Rothschild Group where she was part of the team building the London Private Merchant Banking office for the Bank. She worked at Credit Suisse as Head of the UK Team (UHNWI) responsible for ultra high net worth clients in emerging Europe.

After twenty years in London. Ciurysek-Gedir returned to Poland and has been appointed to the position of Vice President of the management board of Bank Pekao SA, with effect from January 2018.

=== Art ===
Ciurysek-Gedir's artwork has been auctioned by Sotheby’s, Philips and Dreweatts & Bloomsbury Auctions. Her art has been exhibited internationally during exhibitions in London, Vancouver, Monaco, Cap Ferrat, and Dubai.

Ciurysek-Gedir served as a producer on the short film Battle for Britain, a comedy-drama highlighting the role played by Polish pilots in the Battle of Britain starring Julian Glover.
