= Roseann, Virginia =

Unincorporated community in Virginia, United States

Coordinates: 37°21′21″N 82°03′03″W

Roseann is an unincorporated community in Buchanan County, Virginia, United States.

== History ==
A post office was established at Roseann in 1934, and remained in operation until it was discontinued in 1964. The community was named for the daughter of the owner of a local coal mine.
