= Roxanne =

Roxanne may refer to:

- Roxanne (given name)
- Hurricane Roxanne, a major hurricane in October 1995

== Music ==
- "Roxanne" (The Police song), a 1978 song by The Police
- "Roxanne" (Arizona Zervas song), a 2019 song by Arizona Zervas
- "Roxanne", a 1978 song by Golden Earring from Grab It for a Second
- Roxanne (band), a band active in the late 1980s

== Films ==
- Roxanne (film), a 1987 movie adaptation of the play Cyrano De Bergerac with Steve Martin and Daryl Hannah
- Roxanne Roxanne, a 2017 American film

== Other ==
- Roxanne (model) (1929–2024), American actress and game show assistant

== See also ==
- Roxane (disambiguation)
- Roxan, a protein that in humans is encoded by the ZC3H7B gene
- Roxann
- Roxana (disambiguation), one of Alexander the Great's wives
- Roxelana, one of Suleiman the Magnificent's wives
- Roshanak, the usual Western spelling of the Persian feminine name
- Roxanne Wars, a series of hip-hop rivalries in the 1980s
- Roxy (disambiguation)
