= Rosanna Lockwood =

British television journalist

- Born: Hong Kong
- Occupations: Journalist, News presenter
- Website: www.rosannalockwood.com

Rosanna Lockwood is a British television journalist and former host of Al Arabiya News former host of news show Prime Time with Rosanna Lockwood, on TalkTV.

== Early life ==
Lockwood was born in Hong Kong. She grew up in the southwest of England. She holds a BA degree in English Literature and Drama from Royal Holloway University of London and a postgraduate diploma in Broadcast Journalism from the London College of Communication.

== Career ==
She began her career as radio reporter for the BBC and LBC, and as a television producer for Bloomberg and ITN.

In 2015, she moved to the United Arab Emirates, where she worked as a freelance television news correspondent for Reuters. In 2020 she moved to Singapore to join CNBC.

Lockwood was the host of her own news show Prime Time with Rosanna Lockwood, on Talk TV.

In 2023, she was a guest host on Piers Morgan Uncensored.
