= Rosanna Li Wei Han =

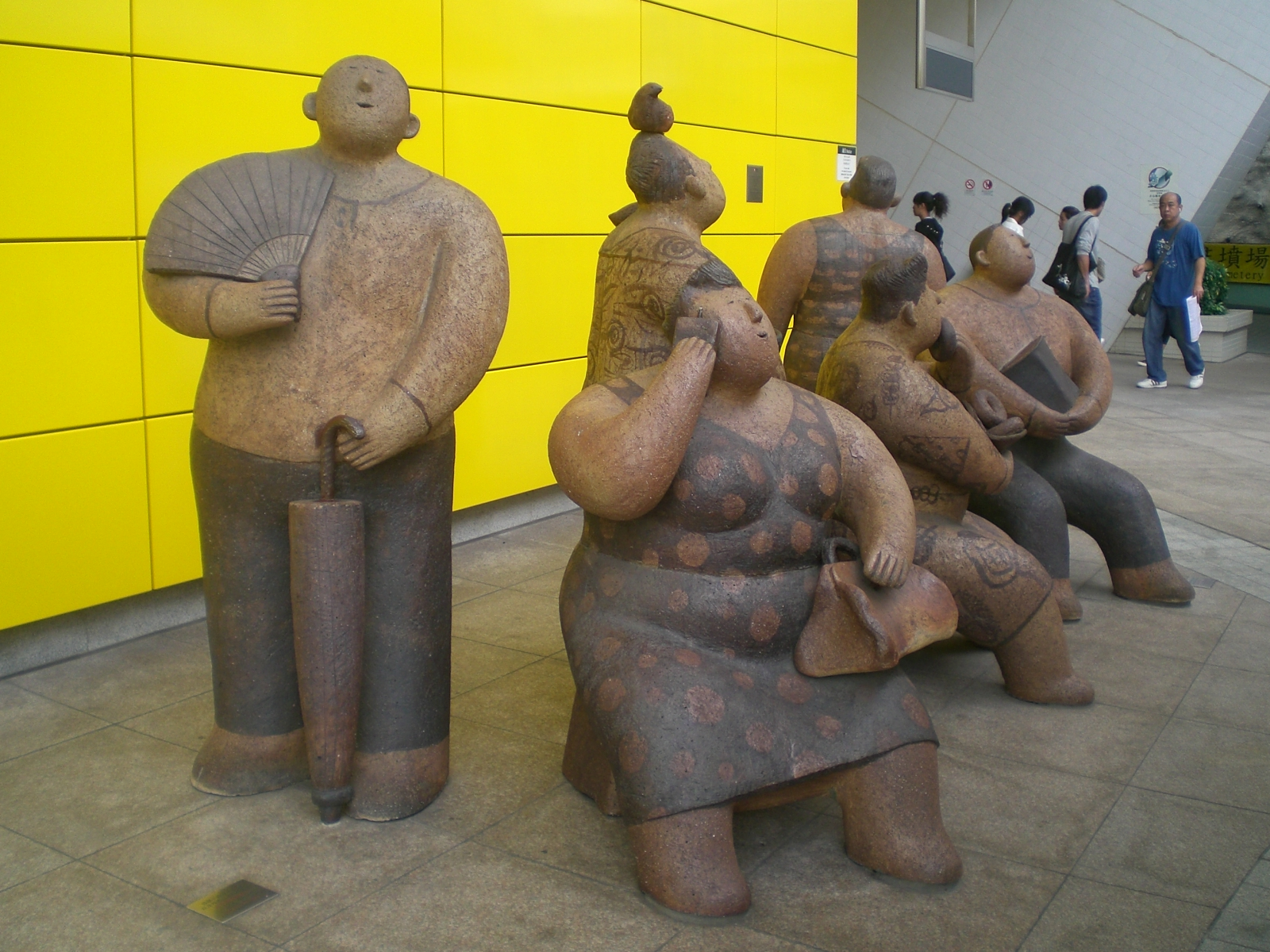
Li's outdoor gallery outside Yau Tong station in Hong Kong, People Passing By, People Lazing By.

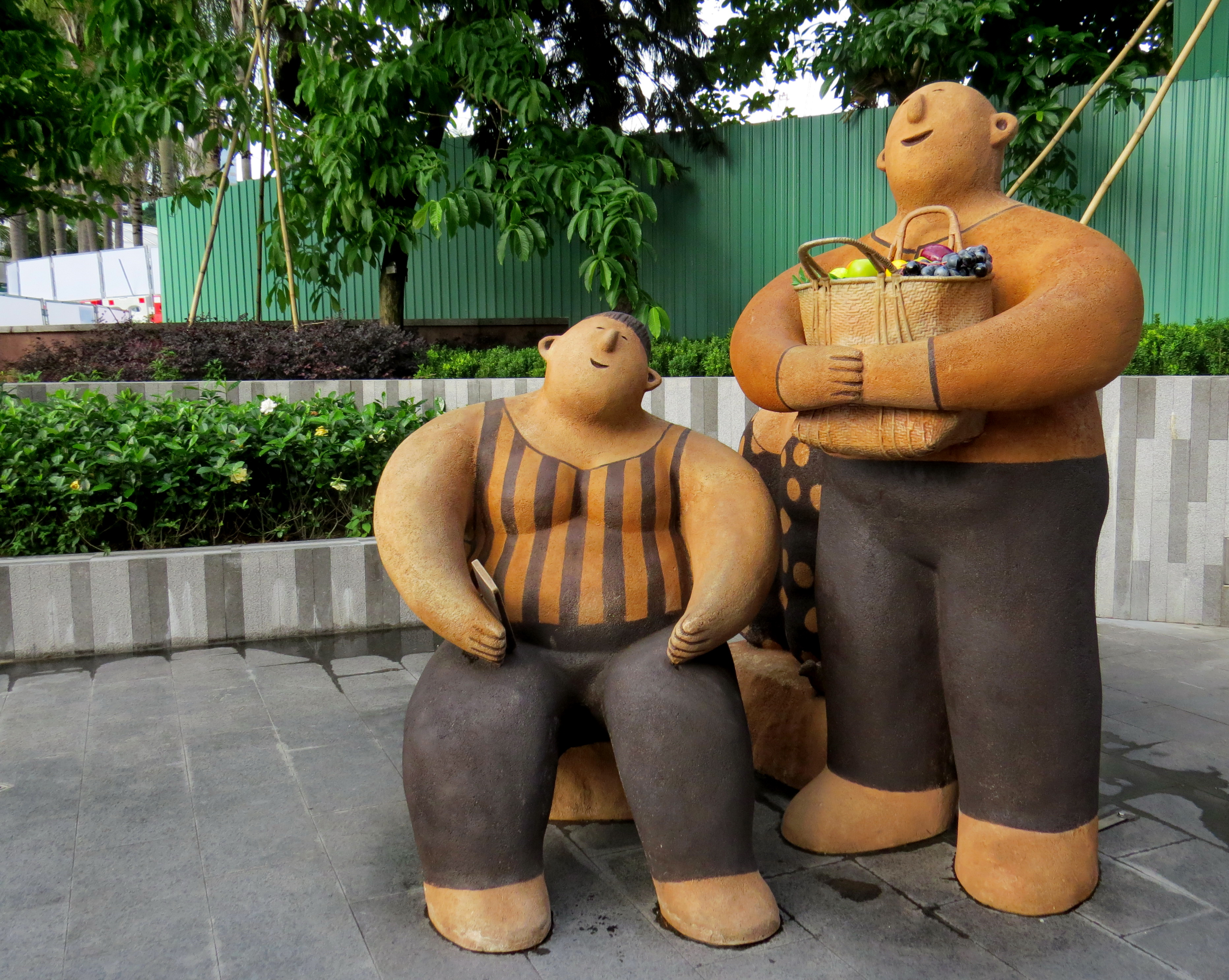
Li's Happy Folks I displaying in "Heaven, Earth and Man – A Hong Kong Art Exhibition" in Art Square at Salisbury Garden.

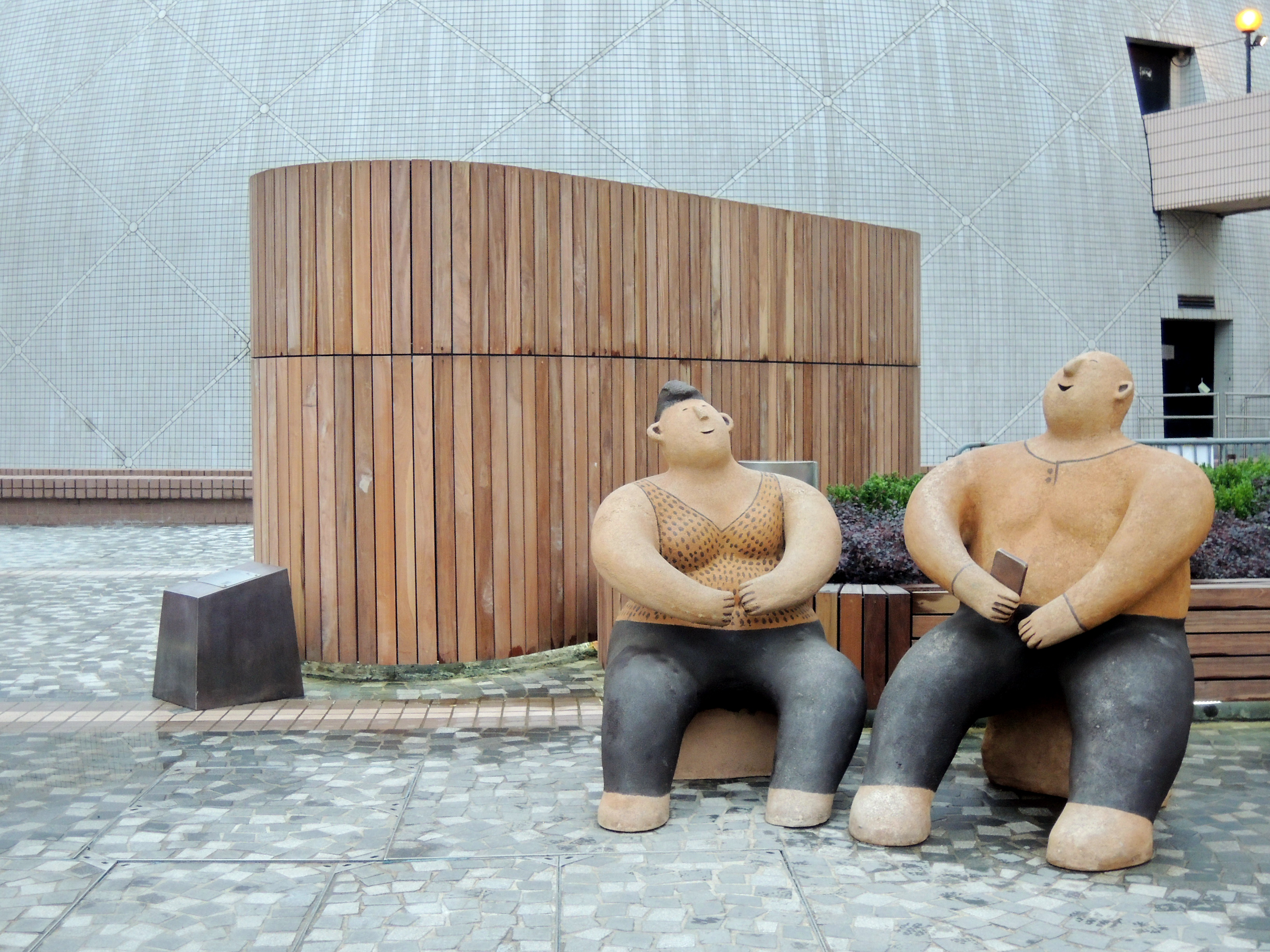
Li's Happy Folks II displaying in "Heaven, Earth and Man – A Hong Kong Art Exhibition" in Art Square at Salisbury Garden.

Rosanna Li Wei Han (Chinese: 李慧嫻) is a Hong Kong artist and sculptor.

She is an associate professor at the Hong Kong Polytechnic University and an honorary consultant of the Hong Kong Museum of Art and Hong Kong Heritage Museum.

== Works ==
Rosanna Li Wei Han is known for her "signature ceramic fat ladies" sculptures. Her most famous work is a permanent public sculpture in Yau Tong station, titled People Passing By, People Lazing By. Her work is currently being temporarily exhibited at the Hong Kong University of Science and Technology Library in Spring 2018.

== Qualification ==
- MA in Educational Management, Cheltenham & Gloucester College, UK
- Post-graduate Diploma in Art Education, University of London, UK
- B.Ed (Hons) University of Liverpool, UK (Education & Ceramics)
- Higher Certificate in Studio Ceramics, Hong Kong Polytechnic
- Specialist Certificate in the Teaching of Art, Grantham College of Education, HK
- Teacher Certificate, Northcote College of Education
