= Rosana Hermann =

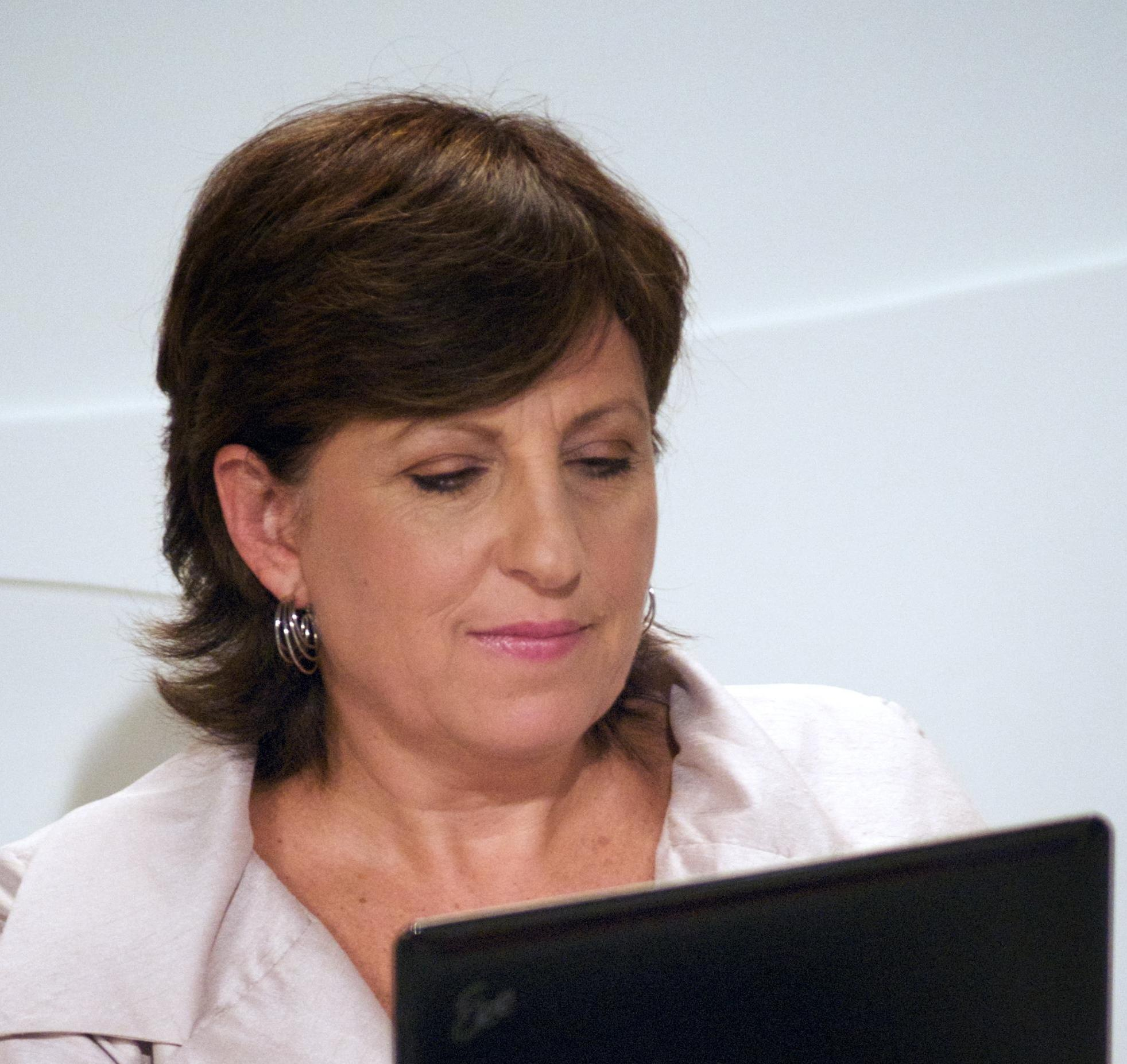
Hermann in 2009

Rosana Hermann (born July 26, 1957, in São Paulo) is an author, writer and host in Brazil. Her last program was "Atualíssima" with Leão Lobo on Rede Bandeirantes, and is also a columnist for several blogs, including 'Querido Leitor'.

Since 2000, Rosana has kept a blog. In 2008 she received the BOBs Award granted by Deutsche Welle as the best blog in Portuguese.

== Biography ==
She has a bachelor's in physics and post grad in nuclear physics by the Institute of Physics, University of São Paulo and has a basic course in communication at the School of Arts and Communication, University of São Paulo. She began her career in television as a producer in writer-Editevê RMC, where she was hired to produce a program for Rede Bandeirantes television. She has worked professionally in TV since 1983, and on the Internet since 1995.

Between the years 1996 and 1997 she worked as a scriptwriter in São Paulo team of editors of Sai de Baixo, along with Flavio de Souza, Elias Coutinho Andreato and Laerte.

After leaving Rede Bandeirantes, Rosana worked at Rede Record, where she was host of the show "Speak Brazil" for four years. She was artistic director of the Women's Television Network.

Throughout her career, she worked at SBT, Radio Jovem Pan, Rede Globo Headline as a screenwriter. (Domingão Faustão, Sai de Baixo, etc.).

She is co-author of All the Great Mind Capture and was columnist of the Journal of Curious and the Jornal da Tarde. On the Internet, she became a columnist for several websites, and created many others. Among them, the blog, Dear Reader.

In 2005, she was a partner of media and marketing company called Synapsys, where he served in the role of reporter, writer and editor programs.

In 2008, she went to Rede Bandeirantes leaving the function editor program Panic on TV. Band on the hot headed next to Leo Lobo until, in late 2008, the program was canceled, yet remain as contracted Rosana da Band 2010. She presented the "Night is a Child" led by Otavio Mesquita.

In September 2009, took over as director of Product Creation and R7, the Internet portal of the Record.

In February 2010, Rosana became a teacher of the course of TV writer in the College of Communication at Fundação Armando Alvares Penteado.
