= Roxanne (given name) =

Roxanne is a Persian feminine given name. The English rendition of the name is derived from Greek Ῥωξάνη (Rhōxanē, Latinised to Roxana), used for one of Cambyses II's wives, the daughter of Idérnēs, a sister of one sister of King Mithridates VI, and the wife of Alexander the Great. The name originates from the Old Persian Raṷxšnā-, meaning "bright" or "radiant". It shares the same etymology as the Persian word roshan (روشن), which also means "light" or "bright".

== People ==
- Roxana, Bactrian princess and wife of Alexander the Great
- Saint Humility (1226–1310), Italian saint known as Saint Roxanne (Santa Rosanna)
- Roxanne Avent (born 1976), American film producer and movie studio executive
- Roxanne Barcelo (born 1985), Filipino-American actress, model and singer
- Roxanne Barker (born 1991), South African football goalkeeper
- Roxanne Beck, American singer and voice actress
- Roxanne Beckford (born 1969), American actress
- Roxanne Benjamin, American film producer, writer and director
- Roxanne Bovenberg (born 1989), Dutch handball player
- Roxanne Conlin (born 1944), United States Attorney for the Southern District of Iowa
- Roxanne Constantin, Canadian musician
- Roxanne Donnery American politician from New York
- Roxanne Dunbar-Ortiz (born 1939), American historian, writer and feminist
- Roxanne Dufter (born 1992), German speed skater
- Roxanne Ellis (1942–1995), American murder victim
- Roxanne Emery (born 1984), English singer-songwriter, multi-instrumentalist and producer
- Roxanne Franck (born 1998), French female handball player
- Roxanne Guinoo (born 1986), Filipino actress
- Roxanne Hart (born 1952), American actress
- Roxanne James (born 1966), Canadian politician
- Roxanne Jensen, American politician from North Dakota
- Roxanne Jones (1928–1996), American politician from Pennsylvania
- Roxanne Kernohan (1960–1993), Canadian actress
- Roxanne Lowit, New York-based fashion and celebrity photographer
- Roxanne McDonald (born c. 1960), Australian actress
- Roxanne McKee (born 1980), English actress and model
- Roxanne Modafferi (born 1982), American mixed martial artist
- Roxanne Nesbitt, Canadian interdisciplinary artist
- Roxanne Didier Nicholas (born 1992), St. Lucian dancer and beauty pageant titleholder
- Roxanne Pallett (born 1982), English actress and singer
- Roxanne Persaud, American politician from New York
- Roxanne Potvin (born 1982) Canadian bilingual singer, guitarist and songwriter
- Roxanne Pulitzer (born 1951), American novelist and actress
- Roxanne Qualls (born 1953), American mayor of Cincinnati, Ohio
- Roxanne Quimby (born 1950), American artist and businesswoman
- Roxanne Roberts (born 1954), American style writer for the Washington Post
- Roxanne "Roxy" Saint (born 1977) American singer, musician, video producer
- Roxanne Seeman (born 1954), American songwriter and lyricist
- Roxanne Shanté (born 1969), American hip hop musician
- Roxanne Starr, American graphic designer and comic book letterer
- Roxanne Swentzell (born 1962), American ceramist
- Roxanne Tong (born 1987), Hong Kong beauty pageant contestant
- Roxane Turcotte (born 1952), Canadian author
- Roxanne Varza (born 1985), Iranian-American company executive
- Roxanne Wilson (born 1979), American businesswoman
- Roxanne Ashley Yu (born 1997), Filipino swimmer

== Roxanna ==
- Roxanna Bennett, Canadian poet
- Roxanna Brown, prominent authority on Southeast Asian ceramics and director of the Bangkok University's Southeast Asian Ceramics Museum
- Roxanna Carrillo, Peruvian activist and feminist
- Roxanna June, Playboy model
- Roxanna Panufnik, British composer of Polish heritage

== Fictional characters ==
- Roxane, cousin and main love interest of the titular character in the play Cyrano de Bergerac (1897)
- Roxanne "Roxy" Washington, a Marvel character known as Bling!
- Roxanne Featherly, a character in DuckTales.
- Roxanne Ritchi, a TV news reporter in the movie Megamind
- Roxanne, a character in Good Burger
- Roxanne, the high school love interest of Max Goof in A Goofy Movie
- Roxanne / Christina M. Constantino, a character from Ngayon at Kailanman (2018 TV series)
- Roxanne Fatima "Roxy" G. Cristobal, a character from Senior High and High Street
- Roxy Lalonde, via Homestuck
- Roxanne "Roxy" Mangubat, a character from Kadenang Ginto
- Roxanne Opeña, a character from FPJ's Ang Probinsyano
- Roxanne Richter, one of Ramona's exes in Scott Pilgrim
- Roxanne Simpson, love interest of Johnny Blaze in Marvel Comics
- Dr. Roxanne Vanderwheele, an archeologist from the cartoon "Tutenstein".
- Roxanne Wolf, one of the animatronics in Five Nights at Freddy's: Security Breach
- Roxanne "Roxie" Hart, the protagonist of the play Chicago (1926) and the musical of the same name (1975)
- Roxy, fairy of animals and the unofficial 7th member of the Winx Club.

== See also ==
- Roxanne (disambiguation)
- Roxann
- Roxana
- Roshanak (Origin of this given name)
