= Rossana (candy) =

Italian nut candy

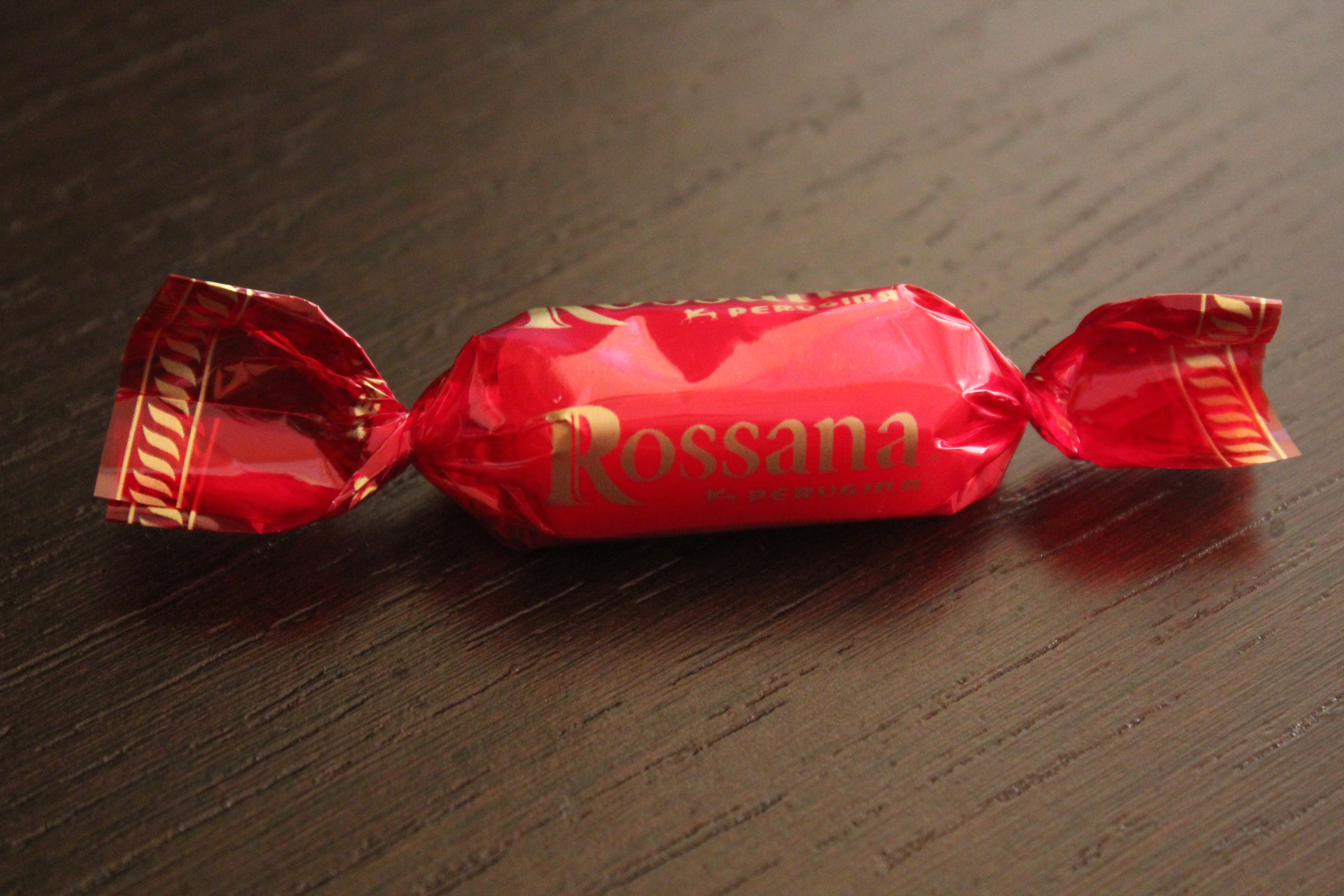
- Alternative names: Rossana Perugina
- Type: Nut desserts
- Place of origin: Italy
- Main ingredients: Glucose syrup, sugar, sweetened condensed milk, peanut oil, whey powder, skimmed milk powder, anhydrous butter, hazelnuts, almonds, apricot kernels, flavourings, sunflower lecithin, white chocolate
- Food energy (per serving): 422 kcal/1.785 kJ
Nutritional value
(per serving)
- Protein: 2,7 g
- Fat: 7,2 g
- Carbohydrate: 86,6 g

Rossana is an Italian candy, formerly known as Rossana Perugina. It is considered one of the most famous candies produced in Italy.

== History ==
Rossana was created in 1926 by Perugina, as a tribute to Roxane, Cyrano de Bergerac's lover. In 2016, Nestlé, which had owned Perugina since 1987, sold the brand to the company Fida.

Rossana was the favourite candy of statesman Giulio Andreotti.

== Varieties ==
In 2018, "Rossana Chocolat" was launched. In 2019, a cream-filled version was produced, sold in 200g jars and made using the confectionery's filling.

In May 2022, "Rossana pistachio," a green confectionery with Sicilian pistachios, was launched, followed in March 2023 by "Rossana coco," a gluten-free variant.
