= Roxy Theatre, Parramatta =

Roxy Theatre
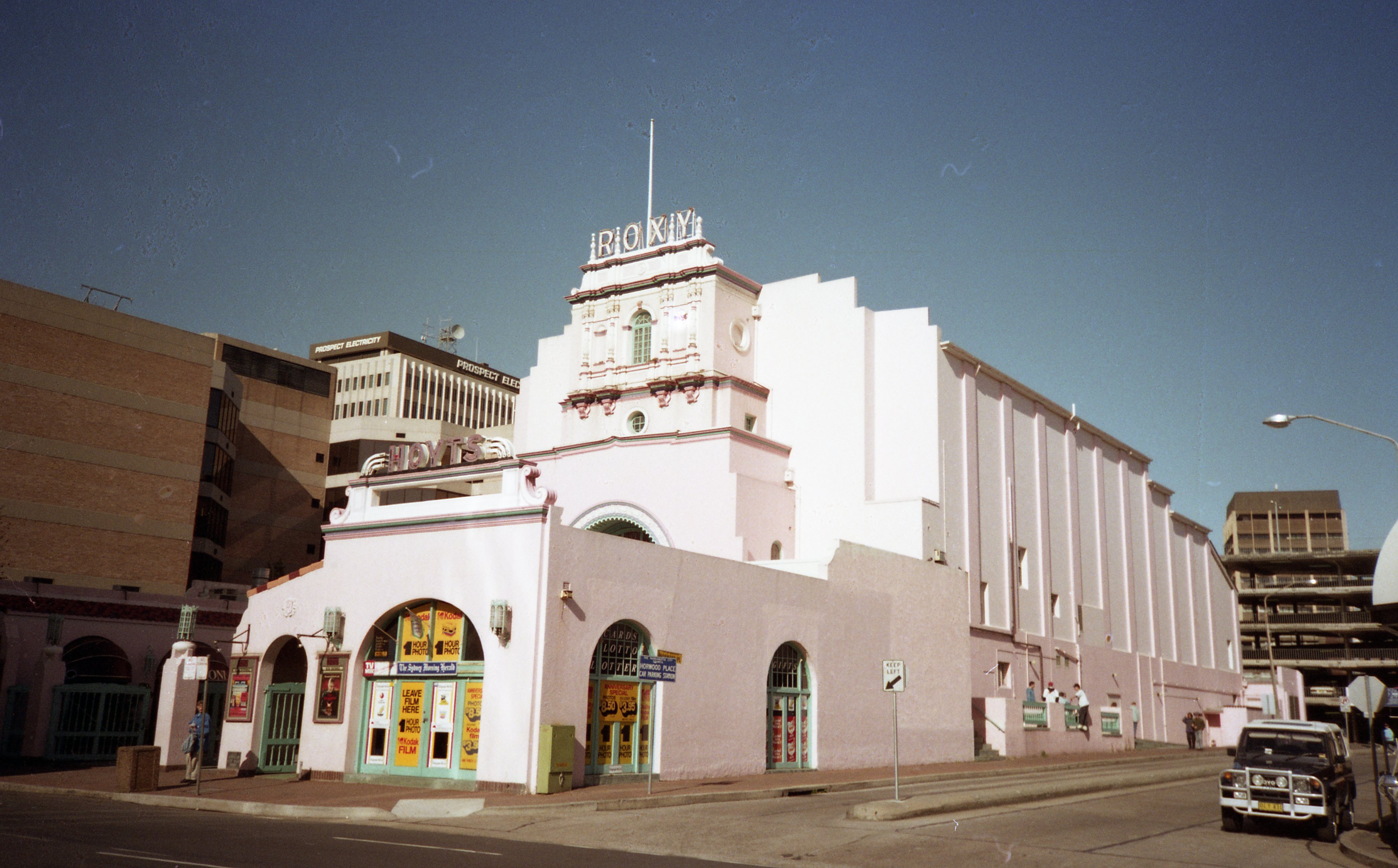
- The Roxy Theatre in 1993, while still a working cinema

- Location within New South Wales Location within Australia
- 33.8145°S 151.0054°E
- Location: 65–69 George Street, Parramatta, City of Parramatta, New South Wales, Australia

Site notes
- Architect(s): Moore & Dyer in association with Herbert & Wilson
- Owner: The Palace Group

New South Wales Heritage Register
- Official name: Roxy Theatre; Roxy Spanish Theatre; Hoyts Roxy Centre; Village Roxy 3
- Type: state heritage (built)
- Designated: 2 April 1999
- Reference no.: 711
- Type: Cinema
- Category: Recreation and Entertainment

Roxy Theatre is a heritage-listed former theatre at 65–69 George Street, Parramatta, City of Parramatta, New South Wales, Australia. It was designed by Moore & Dyer in association with Herbert & Wilson. It is also known as Roxy Spanish Theatre, Hoyts Roxy Centre, Village Roxy 3 and The Roxy. It was added to the New South Wales State Heritage Register on 2 April 1999.

== History ==
The Roxy Theatre was the first in a proposed chain of suburban theatres managed by Roxy Theatres Ltd and was "named after the master cinema-showman himself". Originally it had 1923 seats and though it was opened with the "Talkies", it had a Christie theatre organ which was reputedly one of the largest and finest in the state.

In June 1929 The Cumberland Argus and Fruitgrowers' Advocate reported that "negotiations have practically been completed for the purchase of a suitable site in George Street...owned by Mr. L. Jack...at present occupied by two two-storey houses and a cottage" for the construction of a theatre designed especially for the "Talkies". Two adjoining properties were simultaneously sold for the construction of a number of shops. The sale thus comprised in total, 59, 61, 63, 65, 67 and 69 George Street.

The opening on 6 February 1930 was "an event of considerable social importance" with "a packed audience and an interested crowd of several thousands in the street opposite the brilliantly-illuminated entrance". The "formal ceremony of dedication was performed by the Mayor" supported by local dignitaries and a state MP. The theatre was "praised as a symbol of local progress" and the evening features 'greetings to the people of Parramatta "voiced" from the screen by several Paramount film stars.'

The architecture of the buildings was a sincere attempt at the Spanish style in a time when Australia was "infected" by "a kind of Spanish/Moorish/Venetian style". It exhibited a "provincial simplicity" in its arcaded forecourt, foyer and auditorium but also included "a few Mesopotamian bull sphinxes over the proscenium". Contemporary descriptions of the large palm court in front noted it "adorned with palms and ferns, and flanked with arcades." The main entrance under the ornate quasi-Spanish Mission tower opened into an elaborate two-storey high foyer with Spanish motifs. The auditorium was noted for its striking proscenium and splay walls, ceiling dome with its sunburst lighting effects, mock windows on the side walls and blind arcading supporting the deep ceiling cornice. The building was also air-conditioned.

In 1937 Western Suburbs Ltd leased the cinema. Hoyts purchased the site in 1946. During the war the elaborate ceiling luminaries were removed and in the 1950s the organ was sold but little else was altered until the 1970s.

In 1974 sale of the theatre by Hoyts was proposed and with an unsure future, the site was classified by the National Trust of Australia (NSW) as an important example of a suburban picture palace. The Trust made the Roxy the second cinema in NSW after the State Theatre in Sydney, to be placed on its Register.

Though demolition was prevented, in 1976 Hoyts tripled the cinema removing the original proscenium and splay walls and cutting off the dress circle from downstairs to form one cinema. The ceiling and walls of the upper part of the auditorium were retained while the remainder of the stalls was converted to two smaller cinemas. Minor alterations were made to the vestibule. The front courtyard was retained. New shops were installed in the side wings.

Photographs in the National Library collection show the Prime Minister Gough Whitlam at the re-opening of the Roxy in 1976 with a capacity crowd, night lighting and the planting of a special tree in a tub.

In 1979 Hoyts sold the Roxy to Village Cinemas.

In 1982 the exterior was repainted and in 1988 the forecourt was refurbished with new shops installed in the arcaded wings flanking the front courtyard. The building was painted externally and internally, opening again on 13 November. Village Theatres took control in July 1996.

A c. 1930 photograph of the Roxy's front courtyard showed young Lord Howe Island palms (Kentia sp., either K.fosteriana or K.belmoreana). A c.1976 and another 1996 photograph of the courtyard showed no planting. Since then Lord Howe Island palms were planted in the courtyard in two rows, complementing the theatre's architecture and era and Hollywood/California/South Sea Island imagery.

In March 2002 the Roxy Cinema closed for the last time, after 72 years use as a cinema. In 2004 it was bought by the Palace Group who commenced renovations - gutting the two lower, more recent cinemas and turning it into a nightclub.

In March 2004 the Roxy was reopened after being redeveloped into an entertainment complex. Renamed "The Roxy", the hotel provided a bar with access to the courtyard, a venue to view live entertainment and to hold functions in a contemporary atmosphere within an elegant and historical setting.

After issues arising with behaviour of some patrons and the Police, the owner decided to close the Roxy Hotel venue on 31 July 2014.

In December 2017, Urbis Pty Ltd proposed a redevelopment of the site which would see the Roxy Theatre restored as a "multi-purpose space for cinema, lectures, performances and functions" as part of a five-level entertainment, performance and function centre podium, with a 27-storey office tower on top. The proposed redevelopment necessitated the destruction of the original Stalls and stage areas but would preserve the upstairs Dress Circle. The National Trust of Australia expressed concerns about the design and around avoiding damage during construction, while community group The Roxy Theatre Action Group opposed the development on the basis that any potential for the Roxy to be reinstated as a theatre would be lost for all time.

In July 2018, the Heritage Council of New South Wales recommended rejection of the proposed redevelopment due to the "disparity in scale" between the theatre and proposed tower, as well as the visual impact of the tower on the theatre. The Heritage Council sought to limit the size of the tower to twelve storeys. The owner strongly opposed the suggestion of reducing the size, and floated reopening the venue as a nightclub if rejected. Plans to redevelop the site and demolish the original structure to accommodate a large residential tower were not approved by Parramatta Council in 2018 and the matter was referred to the Land and Environment Court, which upheld Parramatta Council's decision.

== Description ==
The Roxy Theatre is an Inter-War Spanish Mission purpose-built cinema building flanked on either side by loggias containing shops. The central arched entrance is richly decorated with stuccoed ornamentation. The Roxy is the best surviving example in Australia of the adaptation of this style of architecture to a large public building, making the most consistent use of the Spanish Mission style throughout.

The building comprises a large "picture palace" cinema in the Spanish Mission Style. The main, double height theatre block is set back from the street frontage behind an 80 ft X 40 ft (24.4m x 12.2m) forecourt lined along the sides by arcaded walkways which terminate in small shops on the street frontage.

The blocky massing of the front facade is symmetrical, centred on a large semi-circular arch over the main entrance. This features a scalloped Moorish soffit and enriched label panel and mouldings. The arch is set in an ornate central tower with the entrance reached via a grand flight of steps. External walls are of stuccoed ornament emphasised by being picked out in (modern) multi-coloured scheme. The original name-sign at the top of the tower is part of the overall facade design.

The main foyer opens directly off the external staircase via a set of timber-framed and glazed doors and comprises a double-height space symmetrically laid out with stairs rising to either side of a central mezzanine/balcony. The foyer retains most of its original layout and character with stuccoed walls, arched openings and vaulted roof to the mezzanine and a "Spanish" style ceiling of panelled and painted timber. The Spanish Mission style is continued in remaining original light fittings, furniture, joinery and floor tiles.

The original main auditorium features extensive plasterwork decoration including arched windows, false balconies and door case along the side walls and a large central dome in the ceiling. Smaller theatres have been fitted below the original stage reducing the overall size of the original auditorium and requiring removal of the proscenium arch. Remnants of original plaster work decoration, however, survive behind the present screen and the theatre retains its original seating.

The fabric of the theatre includes brick interior and exterior, terracotta floor and roof tiles, painted timber, wrought iron and moulded plaster decoration inside.

=== Modifications and dates ===
- World War II - Elaborate ceiling luminaires removed
- 1950s - Original Christie organ removed and sold
- 1976 - Converted to three small theatres by Hoyts. Original proscenium and splay walls removed and dress circle cut off from downstairs to form one cinema. Ceiling and walls of the upper part of the auditorium retained; remainder of stalls converted to two smaller cinemas. Minor alterations made to vestibule
- 1982 - Exterior repainted
- 1988 - Forecourt reinstated to original character and building painted externally and internally

== Heritage listing ==
The Roxy Theatre has high cultural significance as a good and relatively intact representative example of the "Picture Palaces" of the interwar period, its overall form and surviving original fitout and fabric displaying the major attributes of this building type. More particularly it is an excellent example of "Interwar Spanish Mission" style, displaying features typical of this style but also with a notable individuality and quality of architectural design.

The theatre also provides evidence of the changing nature of film theatres and theatre going since the 1920s. Its architectural character and function have been influenced by both national and international developments in film technology and theatre visitation since the adventure of the "Talkies"—ranging from large single auditorium regularly seating nearly 2000 to the present multi-theatre configuration. The size and architectural character of the building also reflect American cultural influences in the interwar period and the profitability of "Picture Palaces".

The location and origins of the theatre are closely associated with the growth of Sydney's suburbs in the interwar years and Parramatta in particular. It is an attractive and distinctive local landmark and particularly valued by the regular theatre-goers of its early years and those interested in movie and architectural history (its retention in the 1970s being in large measure due to intervention by such groups).

Professional, trade and manufacturing practice - example of the work of notable architect. Evidence of social and cultural life.

Roxy Theatre was listed on the New South Wales State Heritage Register on 2 April 1999 having satisfied the following criteria.

The place is important in demonstrating the course, or pattern, of cultural or natural history in New South Wales.

The Roxy Theatre has historical significance arising from the evidence it provides of the changing character of film theatres and theatre going since the interwar years. Its architectural character and function have been influenced by both national and international developments in film technology, theatre design and theatre-going patterns since the advent of talking pictures in the 1920s.

The theatre's main auditorium (originally seating 1,923) provides evidence of the popularity of film going and influence of movie culture in Australia in the interwar years, and though subsequently subdivided into smaller theatres both it and the building as a whole reflect this early mass-culture phenomenon. The building's subsequent history and changes—including declining popularity to the point of proposed demolition and more recent conversion into a multi-theatre complex retailing selected "nostalgic" features—reflects the full gamut of change in Australian film going over the past 67 years.

The theatre provides evidence of widespread American influence in all aspects of cultural life including particularly architecture and popular culture, particularly film culture (vis a vis Australia's prior local film industry). The building's richly ornamented Spanish Revival Style is part of the development of this style in Australia in the interwar years and more generally of the range of exotic "national" styles as interpreted by Hollywood used throughout the nation for the theatres of the day. The size and architectural character of the building also provide evidence of the economic, profitability of picture theatre development of the day with its large audiences and regular patterns of attendance.

The theatre's location is associated with the spread of population and associated service, including recreational facilities, to Sydney's suburbs as well as, more particularly, with the particular demographics i.e. size and importance—of Parramatta at this time—being originally erected as the first in a proposed suburban chain by the Roxy company. The opening of the building was a notable event with local and state politicians attending, huge crowds and special greetings by leading Hollywood actors of the day.

The place is important in demonstrating aesthetic characteristics and/or a high degree of creative or technical achievement in New South Wales.

The theatre is an outstanding representative example of the "Picture Palaces" of the interwar period, its overall form and surviving original fitout and fabric displaying the major attributes—physical and functional - of this particular "phenomenon". It reflects, for example, the deliberately "escapist" character of both films and film environment in this period as well as the influence of the United States from whence came both films and architectural models for the theatres. It also reflects the contemporary norms which ensured that while theatre going was affordable for almost all, it should provide an opulence and grandeur (in both decoration and facilities such as lounges, smoking rooms, etc.) quite deliberately "other than ordinary".

The Roxy is also a notable example of "Spanish Revival Style"—relating to the style as a whole as it evolved in Australia in the Interwar period and more particularly as the style was applied to theatre design. In design and detailing it displays much that is original and well designed including particularly the open air, arcade-lined forecourt which served as a useful and attractive lobby and also allowed effective viewing of the main elevations of the building and was a very original feature for the day. The building's decorative treatment is a notable and creatively rich example of Spanish Mission forms and features and though judged in its day as a relatively refined one avoiding the "gaudy and garish of contemporary examples" it is today "probably one of the most, if not opulent or richly designed suburban picture palace in Australia...complete with no tell-tale austere corners...spacious and well furnished and the auditorium itself, particularly with the original light fittings, (Christie organ and air-conditioning) rivalling most of the city centre cinemas" in its day.

The aesthetic significance of the building arising from its role as an exemplar of its style and its own intrinsic formal and decorative attributes is greatly enhanced by the relatively high degree of intactness of the building, particularly externally but also in the main foyers and auditorium.

The building is also a notable local landmark, its overall massing with striking tower and set back from the street with flanking arcaded wings and richly decorative detailing contributing to its significance streetscape role.

The place has strong or special association with a particular community or cultural group in New South Wales for social, cultural or spiritual reasons.

The theatre is of significance to several groups within the community most notably to those interested in Australia early movie and theatre history as well as more generally heritage agencies such as the National Trust of Australia (NSW) who became actively involved in the 1970s attempts to stave off demolition.

The building has many strong associations for those who were its regular patrons in earlier years, particularly throughout its heyday in the 1930-50s.

The place possesses uncommon, rare or endangered aspects of the cultural or natural history of New South Wales.

This item is rare.

== See also ==
- Burnie Theatre
- Spanish Colonial Revival architecture
