= Roshanak =

Roshanak or Rowshanak (Persian: روشنک, from early Avestan raoxšna-; adjective: "shining, bright", noun: "light") is a Persian female name. This name has several meanings such as shining little star, lovely flare, and luminous beauty. This name is still popular and in common use in today's Iran. The diminutive form "Roshie" is sometimes heard.

== Variants ==
Ῥωξάνη (Rhōxanē) is the Greek form of this name, Latinised as Roxana, and refers to the Bactrian noblewoman who was the daughter of Oxyartes of Bactria (not Sogdiana) and the official wife of Alexander the Great. Bactria was in the northeastern part of the Persian Achaemenid Empire, defeated by Alexander's army in 330 BCE. It is also the name of Dara's daughter (Dara is a character in Shahnama, likely referring to the Darius of the Achaemenid Empire).

The names 'Roxane' and Roxanne are English and French variants of this name respectively. Diminutives include "Roxie" and "Roxy". For example, Roxane is the name of Cyrano's love in the famous French play Cyrano de Bergerac by Edmond Rostand.

In Spanish and Romanian, the form Roxana is used; while Ruxandra is a Romanian variant. Russian, Ukrainian, and Polish use the same form which is Roksana (Роксана). There used to be an eastern Iranian tribe called the Roxolani in eastern Europe around present-day Ukraine, Moldova, and Romania.

Rahşan is the Turkish variant of the name, being borrowed from the Persian one.
