= Rose (disambiguation) =

A rose is a perennial plant of the genus Rosa, or the flower it bears.

Rose may also refer to:

== Colors ==
- Rose (color)
  - RAL 3017 Rose
- Rose (heraldic tincture)

== Arts, entertainment and media ==
=== Film ===
- Rose (1936 film), a French film
- Rose (2011 film), a Polish film
- Rose (2012 film), a British film
- Rose (2014 film), an Indian film
- Rose (2026 film), a drama
- The Rose (film), a 1979 American film

=== Television ===
- The Rose (Taiwanese TV series), a 2003 Taiwanese drama
- Rose (TV series), a 2019 Burmese dramatic television series
- The Rose (Burmese TV series), a 2022 Burmese horror television series
- "Rose" (Doctor Who), an episode and multiple characters
- "Rose" (Heated Rivalry), an episode of Heated Rivalry
- "Rose" (The Vampire Diaries), an episode of The Vampire Diarires
- "Rose" (Titans episode)
- Rose (Titans character)
- Rose (Keeping Up Appearances), a character
- Rose (Two and a Half Men), a character

=== Gaming ===
- ROSE Online, a 2005 roleplaying game
- Rose (Street Fighter)
- Rose, a fairy chess piece
- Chairman Rose, a character from the game Pokémon Sword and Shield

=== Literature ===
- Rose (comics), a comic book miniseries by Jeff Smith
- Rose (Marvel Comics), a persona used by several characters in Marvel Comics
  - The Rose (comics) or Richard Fisk, a character in Marvel Comics
- Rose Is Rose, comic strip begun in 1984
- Rose (novel), a novel by Martin Cruz Smith
- Rose (play), a 1999 play by Tomson Highway
- "The Rose", a novella by Charles L. Harness
- "The Rose", a section of the collected works of W. B. Yeats
- "The Rose", a fairy tale from Grimms' Fairy Tales

=== Music ===
==== Classical ====
- "Rose", the theme song from Titanic: Music from the Motion Picture
- Rose, a work by Ludovico Einaudi
- La Rose, a work by Giovanni Bassano
- "La Rose", a song by Giovanni Battista Rubini

==== Albums ====
- Rose (Maximilian Hecker album) (2003)
- Rose (Miliyah Kato album) (2005)
- The Rose (film soundtrack), the soundtrack to the 1979 film
- The Rose (TV soundtrack), the soundtrack for the 2003 Taiwanese drama The Rose
- R.O.S.E., a 2018 album by Jessie J
- Rose, an EP by B.A.P (2017)
- Rose, an EP by The Front Bottoms (2014)
- Rose, an EP by Menomena (2001)
- The Rose, a 2002 album by Mediæval Bæbes

==== Songs ====
- "Rose" (Anna Tsuchiya song)
- "Rose" (Versailles song)
- "Rose" (Hana song), 2025
- "Rose" (Jaydes song), 2023
- "The Rose" (song), a 1977 song written by Amanda McBroom and made famous by Bette Midler
- "Rose", a song by Miyeon from her 2022 EP My
- "Rose", a song by A Perfect Circle from their 2000 album Mer de Noms
- "The Rose Song", a 2021 song by Olivia Rodrigo

==== Other uses in music ====
- Rosette (music), a soundhole decoration
- The Rose (band), a South Korean band

== People ==
- Rose (given name)
- Rose (surname)
- Rose (French singer), born 1978
- Rosé (singer), South Korean singer, born 1997
- Rose, an alter ego used by the English streamer F1NN5TER
- Justice Rose (disambiguation)

== Places ==
- Rose, Nova Scotia, Canada
- Rose (Brachtpe), a river of North Rhine-Westphalia, Germany
- Rose, Calabria, Italy
- Rose, Cornwall, England, UK
- Rose-an-Grouse, Cornwall, England, UK
- Rose, Nebraska, an unincorporated community in the US
- Rose, New York, a town in Wayne County, New York, US
- Rose (hamlet), New York, a hamlet in Wayne County, New York, US
- Rose, Oklahoma, US
- Rose, Wisconsin, US
- Rose Township (disambiguation)

== Plants ==
- Christmas rose, Helleborus niger
- Cotton rose, Hibiscus mutabilis
- Desert rose, Adenium
- Guelder rose, Viburnum opulus
- Lenten rose, Helleborus orientalis
- Montpellier rock rose, Cistus monspeliensis
- Primrose, Primula vulgaris
- Rock rose, Cistus
- Rose bay willow herb, Chamaenerion angustifolium
- Rose bay, Nerium oleander, the only species in the genus Nerium
- Rose campion, Silene coronaria
- Rose of China, Hibiscus rosa-sinensis
- Rose of Jericho, Selaginella lepidophylla
- Rose of Sharon, Hypericum calycinum (British Isles) or Hibiscus syriacus (North America)
- Rosemary, Rosmarinus
- Roseroot, Rhodiola rosea
- Rosewood (several species)
- Sun rose, Cistus
- Sydney rock rose, Boronia serrulata
- Wood rose, Distimake tuberosus

== Science ==
- ROSE (compiler framework)
- A/ROSE, computer operating system
- Remote Operations Service Element protocol, an OSI application layer protocol

== Ships ==
- HMS Rose, a list of ships
  - HMS Rose (1712), a 24-gun sixth rate
  - HMS Rose (1757), a 20-gun sixth rate
    - HMS Rose (replica ship) or HMS Surprise, a 1970 replica
  - HMS Rose (1783), a 28-gun sixth rate
- HM hired cutter Rose, a number of hired armed vessels named Rose
- Rose (1786 EIC ship), a British East India Company ship
- Rose (1806 ship), a British slave ship
- MV Rose (1938), a Norwegian cargo ship in service 1938–1939
- PS Rose, a paddle steamer
- USS Rose, a Union Navy tugboat

== Sports ==
- Rose BC, a basketball club based in Miami, Florida

== Theatres ==
- Rose Theatre, Brampton, Ontario
- Rose Theatre, Kingston, England
- The Rose (theatre), London, England

== Other uses ==
- Rose (symbolism)
- Rose (cocktail), a cocktail made of vermouth and cherry eau de vie
- Rose (goat)
- Rose (heraldry), a common device in heraldry
- Rose (mathematics), a sinusoid plotted in polar coordinates
- Rose (topology), a topological space
- Repression of heat shock gene expression (ROSE) element, an RNA element
- ROSE Bikes, a producer of bicycles and equipment from Germany
- Rose Law Firm, a legal practice in Little Rock, Arkansas
- Rose, a water-scattering head of a watering can spout
- The Rose Gaming Resort, an under-construction casino resort in Dumfries, Virginia, US
- Compass rose, a graphic used on maps
- Gold dipped roses
- Project ROSE, a Pakistan Air Force program
- Tropical Storm Rose
- Rose, a character from the sixth season of Battle for Dream Island, an animated web series

== See also ==
- Rosé (disambiguation)
- Rose Garden (disambiguation)
- Rose Hill (disambiguation)
- Corn rose (disambiguation)
- Desert rose (disambiguation)
- Red rose (disambiguation)
- Tokyo Rose (disambiguation)
- Wild Rose (disambiguation)
- The Rose of Tralee (disambiguation)
- Rosa (disambiguation)
- Rosea (disambiguation)
- Roselle (disambiguation)
- Rosen (disambiguation)
- Roser (disambiguation)
- Roses (disambiguation)
- Rosette (disambiguation)
- Rosie (disambiguation)
- Rosine (disambiguation)
- Rosy (disambiguation)
- Roze (disambiguation)
