= Roesy =

Roesy may refer to:

- Roesy (singer)
- ROESY, rotating-frame nuclear Overhauser effect correlation spectroscopy

== See also ==
- Rosey (disambiguation)
- Rosy (disambiguation)
