= Rosie's =

Rosie's may refer to:

- Rosie's Diner, a diner in Rockford, Michigan, United States
- Rosie's Gaming Emporium, a brand of casinos in Virginia, United States
- Rosie's Place, sanctuary for poor and homeless women in Boston, Massachusetts, United States
- The Chatham, also known as Rosie's Bar or Rosie's, a former bar in Monte Carlo, Monaco

== See also ==
- Rosie's Rules, a 2022 children's animated TV show
- Rosie's Theater Kids, an American non-profit arts education organization
- Rosie (disambiguation)
- Roses (disambiguation)
