= Rozes =

Rozes may refer to:

- Rozès, a commune in France
- Rozes (musician) (born 1993), American musician

== See also ==
- Roze (disambiguation)
- Roses (disambiguation)
