= Tralee (disambiguation) =

Tralee is a town in Ireland.

Other uses:

== Places ==
- Tralee, New South Wales
- Tralee, West Virginia

== Things ==
- HMS Tralee (1918), UK minesweeper

== See also ==
- The Rose of Tralee (disambiguation)
- Tralee (UK Parliament constituency)
- Tralee Bay
