= Bertin Nahum =

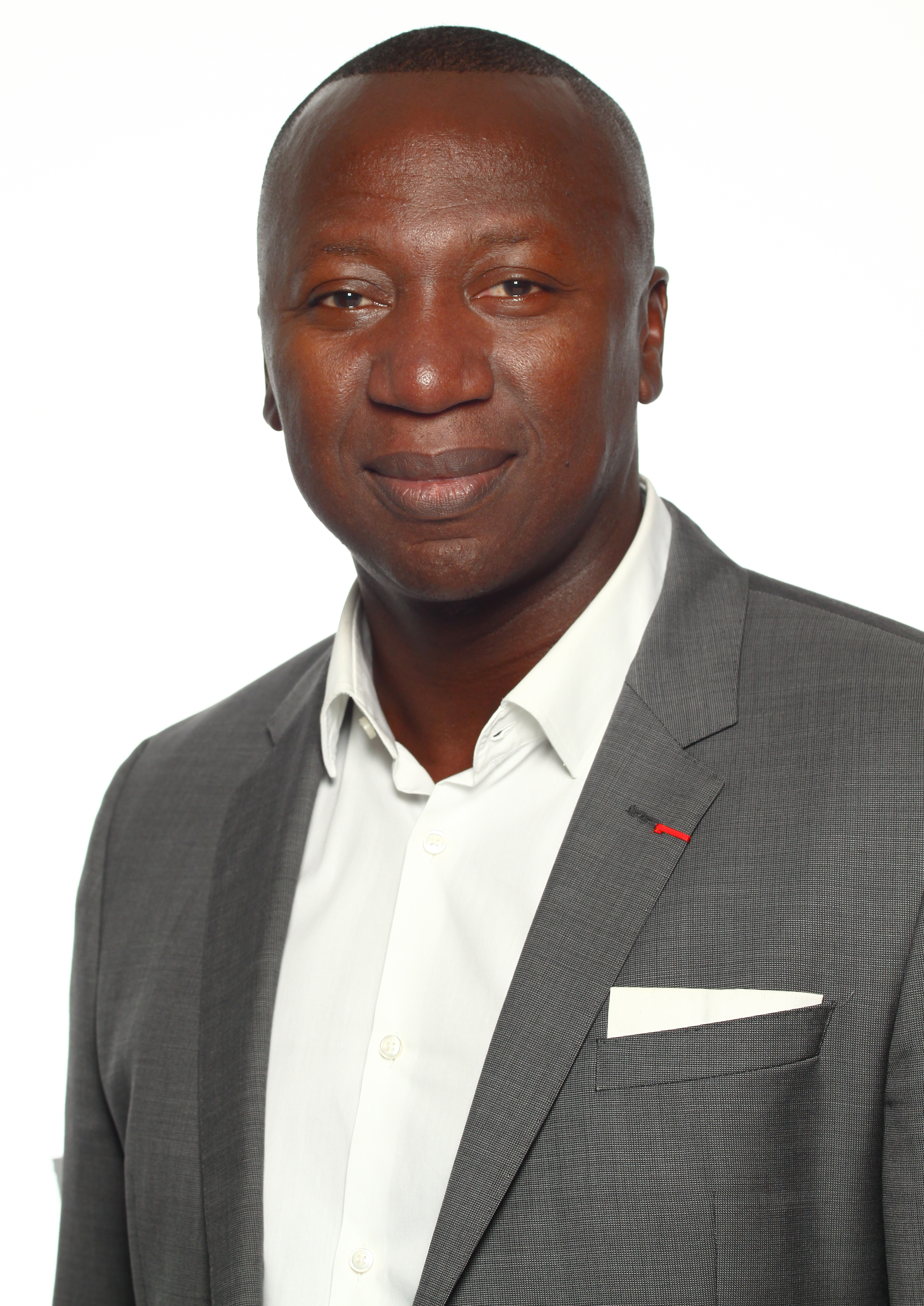
- Nahum in 2014
- Born: November 14, 1969 (age 56); Dakar, Senegal
- Occupation: Entrepreneur

Bertin Nahum (born 14 November 1969 in Dakar, Senegal) is a French-Beninese entrepreneur in surgical robotics. He is the CEO and co-founder of Quantum Surgical based in Montpellier, France. He previously founded in 2002 Medtech S.A; specialized in the design, development and marketing of surgical assistance robots that was sold to Zimmer Biomet in 2016.

== Biography ==
Bertin Nahum attended the National Institute of Applied Sciences in Lyon, France, where he achieved an Engineering Degree. He then went on to study a Masters in Robotics at Coventry University (UK). Following different experiences in the medical engineering field and having collaborated with well-known surgeons, Bertin Nahum decided to devote his career to creating medical technology solutions to enhance surgical interventions, including creating the latest generation of robotic assistance to use during operations. In 2002, after winning the national innovative start-up companies contest organized by the French Ministry of Higher education and Research, Bertin Nahum founded Medtech S.A.

== Medtech S.A. ==
Set up in Montpellier in 2002, the company began to work on minimally-invasive knee surgery and developed its very first robot which they named BRIGIT™. BRIGIT™ was designed to assist surgeons in minimally-invasive placement of knee prostheses. In 2006, the entire patent portfolio protecting BRIGIT™ was acquired by Zimmer Inc., a leader in orthopedic surgery. Medtech S.A reinvested the proceeds of this deal in a new research program which led to the creation of its next robot; ROSA™. This technology has been used successfully on patients with a variety of diseases including Parkinson's, hydrocephalus and drug-resistant forms of epilepsy. Using robotic arms, ROSA™ makes interventions more efficient and less invasive. To this day, thousands of patients across Europe, North America, Asia and the Middle East benefited from brain and spine interventions carried out with ROSA™. In 2013, the company launched a successful initial public offering (IPO), raising EUR 20M on Euronext in Paris. In July 2016, Medtech S.A was acquired by the Zimmer Biomet Group (NYSE: ZBH) for EUR 164M. Bertin Nahum maintained his leadership role and directed Zimmer's robotic development activities at Medtech S.A company's current headquarters in Montpellier until January 2017.

== Quantum Surgical ==
In February 2017, Bertin Nahum co-founded Quantum Surgical, together with three of his former associates. Based in Montpellier (Hérault, France), Quantum Surgical develops the Epione platform, a robotic-assisted percutaneous ablation system. This procedure is an alternative to surgery and makes it possible to treat tumors that are particularly difficult to reach, due to their size or their location. Epione is dedicated to the curative and early treatment of tumors in the lungs and the abdomen (liver, kidneys, pancreas). More than 6,2 million new abdominal and lung cancers are diagnosed worldwide every year.

The Epione® device is CE marked for abdomen and lung indications, and FDA cleared for abdominal ablation indication.

Epione is available at Gustave Roussy (Villejuif, France) and Hospices Civils de Lyon (France). The first patient has been treated in the United States in May 2023 at Baptist Health South Florida. More than 250 patients have been treated worldwide.

In November 2022, Quantum Surgical received the Prix Galien USA in 2022, the equivalent of the Nobel Prize for biopharmaceutical research.

In June 2023, Quantum Surgical joins the French Tech 2030 program. Launched by the French State, the program supports emerging players in breakthrough innovation, in particular to make France a European leader in health innovation.

== Distinctions ==
In September 2012 Bertin Nahum was ranked 4th amongst the top 10 most revolutionary High-Tech Entrepreneurs by the Canadian magazine Discovery Series just behind Steve Jobs, Mark Zuckerberg and James Cameron. One year later, in September 2013, Bertin Nahum was conferred one of the highest French civilian distinction; the prestigious award of Knight of the Legion of Honor which he received from Fleur Pellerin then Minister of innovation and the Digital Economy. In November 2014, Bertin Nahum received the title of Doctor of Technology, honoris causa, from Coventry University (UK) in recognition of his revolutionary contribution to the medical profession by improving surgical procedures using robotic medical technology.
