= Rozay =

Rozay may refer to:

- Rozay-en-Brie, a commune in Seine-et-Marne, Île-de-France, France
- Aundrey Walker (born 1993), nicknamed Rozay, an American football player
- Ricky Rozay, an alternative name for American rapper Rick Ross

== See also ==
- Rosé (disambiguation)
