= Oshibana =

Pressed flower art

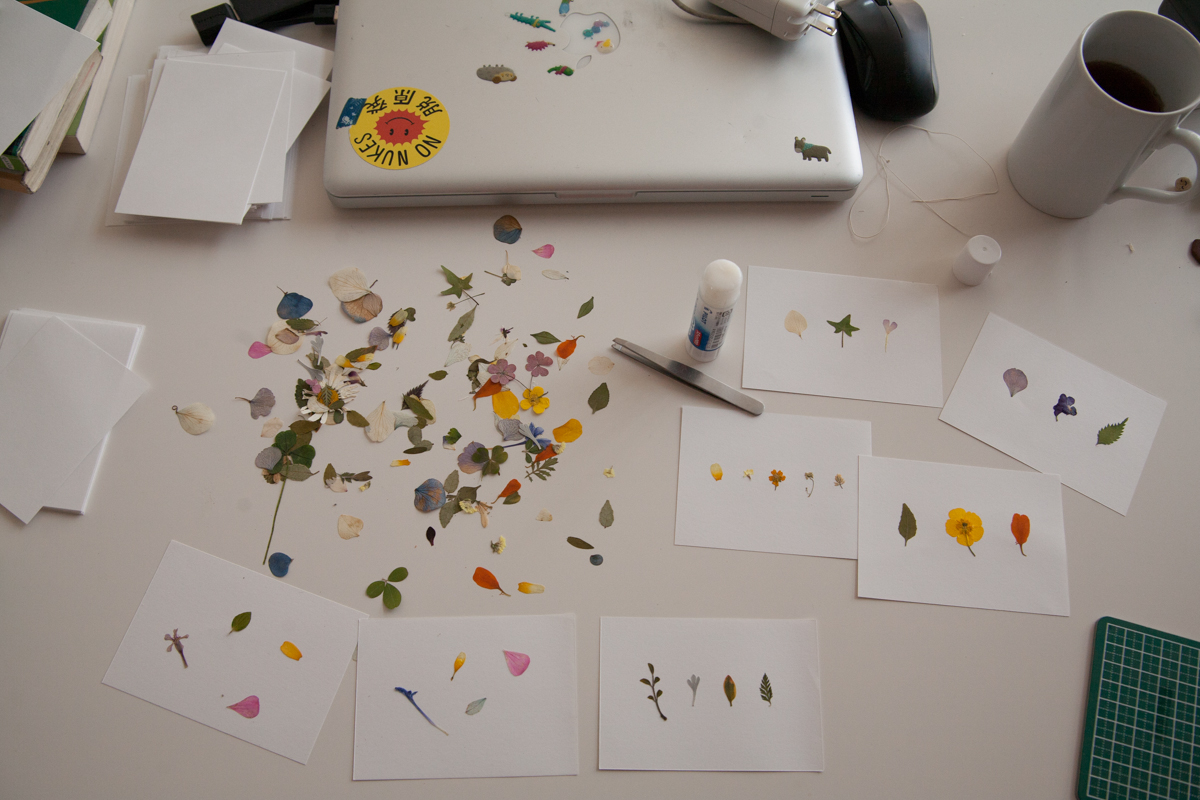
Dried flowers and cards at an oshibana (dried flower art) workshop in Osaka, Japan

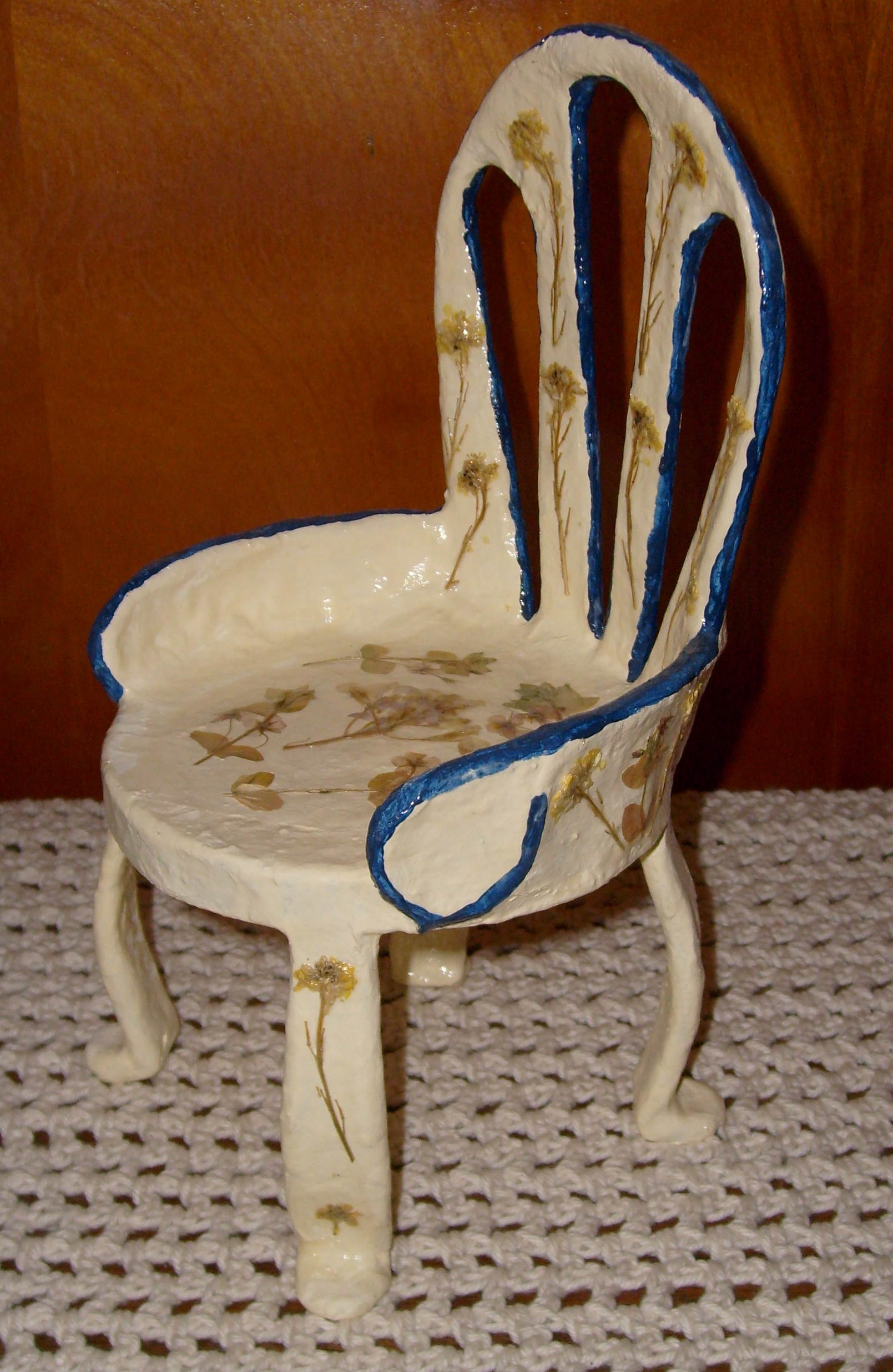
Pressed flower decoupage on a miniature chair.

Oshibana (押し花) is the art of using pressed flowers and other botanical materials to create a picture entirely from natural elements. The production of pressed flower art involves adding flower petals and leaves to a flower press to flatten them and squeeze out moisture, with the resulting materials then used to "paint" an artistic composition. The origin of this art form has been traced to 16th century Japan, but it is now practiced worldwide. The resulting artwork is referred to as an oshibana.

== Historical background ==
As early as the 16th century, samurai were said to have created oshibana as one of their disciplines to promote patience, harmony with nature, and powers of concentration. Similarly, as botanists in Europe began systematic collection and preservation of specimens, art forms using the pressed plant materials developed, particularly during the Victorian era.

The art form became popular in the Holy Land in the late 1890s and into the 20th century, when elaborate souvenir books would combine photographs of holy sites and the pressed flowers gathered at these sites. These photographs and pressed dried flowers were artistically formatted and bound between olive wood covers to be sold to visitors. American actress Grace Kelly, during her years as princess of Monaco, practiced oshibana and helped promote the art of pressed flowers worldwide, employing pressed botanical materials sent to her from abroad. My Book of Flowers, published in 1980, includes chapters on her art.

The art experienced a revival in the United Kingdom from the 1970s to the early 2000s. Some artists outside of Asia have continued to practice oshibana.

== Traditional and emerging methods ==
Pressing flowers makes them appear flat, and there is often a change in color resulting from this process, ranging from faded hues to more vibrant and intense colors. Pressed flowers and leaves can be used in a variety of craft projects. They are often mounted on special paper, such as handmade paper, Ingres paper, Japanese paper, or paper decorated by marbling. Each leaf and flower is glued onto a precise location as part of the construction of larger images.

Washes of watercolor painting are sometimes applied to the backing paper before the pressed material is attached. Pressed material may also be mounted on fabrics, such as velvet, silk, linen or cotton. Petals and leaves can also be applied to wood furnishings using the technique of decoupage.

Oshibana artists continue to employ various new technologies in pressing methods, framing techniques, and color enhancement to help the pressed materials retain their appearance through the years. Nobuo Sugino (a pioneering figure in contemporary oshibana) and his father developed the use of dessicant papers to help pressed flowers hold color. A method of vacuum-sealing frames to lock in the color, texture, and clarity of petals and leaves (and help prevent intrusion from moisture and fungi) was also developed in Japan and is now practiced by many oshibana artists worldwide.

== International organizations ==
=== International Pressed Flower Art Society ===
The IPFAS in an international pressed flower organization that promotes pressed flower art and offers education and holds competitions. As of 2010, it has members from over 20 nations including Japan, the United Kingdom, United States, France, Germany, Mexico, and Australia. It was founded in 1999 by Nobuo Sugino, a Japanese pressed flower artist.

=== Pressed Flower Craft Guild ===
In the UK, the Pressed Flower Craft Guild was established in 1983 by Joyce Fenton (a pressed flower artist) and Bill Edwardes (who devised the method of framing pressed flower pictures adopted by the guild), growing to include members across the world. The organization was closed in March 2025.

=== Worldwide Pressed Flower Guild ===
The WWPFG was established in July 2001. In November 2008, the guild was incorporated in North Carolina as a public educational non-profit organisation.

=== Others ===
In recent decades, the emergence of several international art associations and schools have helped popularize and increase the recognition of oshibana as a unique art form through classes, conferences, international exhibitions and competitions. These include:

- Philadelphia Flower Show, organized by the Pennsylvania Horticultural Society, host of an annual oshibana/pressed flower art competition
- Oshibana Art, a Japanese pressed flower organization and school founded by Mirian Tatsumi in 1996 in São Paulo, Brazil

== See also ==
- Illustration
- Graphic design
- Gold dipped roses
- Herbarium, a scientific plant collection, usually of pressed plants
