= Dad Rocks! =

Dad Rocks! is a musical project formed by Icelander Snævar Njáll Albertsson in 2010. Based in Aarhus, Denmark, he gathered musicians there to record and perform with. The band includes members Snævar Njáll Albertsson (guitar, vocals, piano), Nikolaj Skjold (electronics, vocals), Peter Skibsted (bass, vocals), Kasper Brinck (drums), Asger Christensen (violin), Thomas Rye Simonsen (cornet), Jakob Sørensen (trumpet), Iris Marie Jakobsen (viola) and Mads Nuomi (trombone). Dad Rocks! signed to UK record label in 2010 when they released the debut EP Digital Age. The debut album Mount Modern was released on a wider range of labels such as Big Scary Monsters (UK), Paper Garden Records (US), Friend of Mine Records (JP), les disques Normal (FR) and Father Figure Records (Scandinavia). The band's second album, Year of the Flesh, was first released in Denmark, and was released internationally in September 2014.

== History ==
Dad Rocks! came into being after singer and songwriter Snævar Njáll Albertsson became a father in 2009. Being an active member and lyricist in the Danish math-rock band Mimas, he found himself writing songs that did not fit Mimas' style. In 2010 Dad Rocks! recorded Digital Age with his friends in Danish label Kanel Records, who also released the EP in Denmark. In August that year Dad Rocks! signed to UK label Big Scary Monsters Records, who released Digital Age in the UK in August 2010. After touring as Dad Rocks! along with Mimas in 2010 Albertsson recorded his debut album Mount Modern in the winter of 2011. This time Albertsson brought more musicians to the studio and decided to record in Aarhus Lydstudie. Many of these musicians would later become his backing band when performing live. The record was released by a handful of record labels in Asia, America and Europe. Dad Rocks! toured extensively and performed at festivals such as Iceland Airwaves, SPOT Festival, Reeperbahn Festival and Berlin Music Week. Dad Rocks! also asked fans to make remixes of the album, and later released Mount Remix for free.

Mount Modern was later released in (Germany) in September 2012, where Dad Rocks! toured extensively, and supported label mates Tall Ships for 15 gigs in United Kingdom. Albertsson also released a mash-up EP called AC!D DORKS, on his own label Father Figure Records. He stated that a man called Jack had sent him a mash-up of his music, and thought it was so good that he had to release the EP.

In the beginning of 2013, Dad Rocks! went to Aarhus Lydstudie again to record his sophomore record, Year of the Flesh. This time he brought in even more collaborators, including a female choir and a full brass band. The album was expected to be released internationally in September 2014.

== Discography ==
- Digital Age (2010)
- Big Scary Covers (2010)
- Mount Modern (2011)
- AC!D DORKS (2012)
- Year of the Flesh (2014)
