= Las Rosas =

Las Rosas may refer to:

Argentina

- Las Rosas, Santa Fe

Mexico

- Las Rosas, Chiapas

Spain

- Las Rosas (Madrid Metro)

== See also ==
- Rosas (disambiguation)
