= Rosa =

Rosa or De Rosa may refer to:

== Plants and animals ==
- Rosa (plant), the genus of roses
- Rosa (sea otter), a sea otter that has become popular on the internet
- Rosa (cow), a Spanish-born cow

== People ==
- Rosa (given name)
- Rosa (surname)
- Santa Rosa (female given name from Latin - a latinized variant of Rose)

== Places ==
- 223 Rosa, an asteroid
- Rosa, Alabama, a town, United States
- Rosa, Germany, in Thuringia, Germany
- Rösa, a village and former municipality in Saxony-Anhalt, Germany
- Rosà a town in the province of Vicenza, Veneto, Italy
- Monte Rosa, the second-highest mountain in the Alps and Western Europe
- Republic of South Africa, a southernmost country in Africa.

== Film and television ==
- Rosa (1986 film), a Hong Kong film released by Bo Ho Films
- Rosa – A Horse Drama, a 1993-94 opera by Louis Andriessen on a libretto by Peter Greenaway
- "Rosa" (Doctor Who), an episode of the eleventh series of Doctor Who

== Music ==
- "Rosa", a song by Pixinguinha
- De Rosa (band), a band from Scotland
- "Rosa", a song by Anitta and Prince Royce from the album Kisses, 2019
- "Rosa", a song by Jacques Brel
- "Rosa", a song by J Balvin from Colores, 2020
- "Rosa", a song by Magín Díaz, recorded by Los Soneros de Gamero and Irene Martínez in 1983 (original recording by Sexteto Habanero Godínez titled "Rosa, qué linda eres")

== Vehicles ==
- USS Rosa (SP-757), a United States Navy patrol boat in commission from 1917 to 1918
- Rosa (barge), a hotel barge
- Mitsubishi ROSA, a bus built by Mitsubishi Fuso
- De Rosa (bicycle company)

== Technology ==
- ROSA, a surgical robot
- ROSA (operating system), a Linux distribution
- Red Hat OpenShift Service on AWS, containerization software for OpenShift
- RCA open-source application
- Romanian Space Agency
- Roll Out Solar Array

== Other uses ==
- Record of School Achievement, an Australian education qualification
- Romanian Space Agency
- Hurricane Rosa, several storms
- ROSA (ISA), the feminist campaign of the International Socialist Alternative
- ROSA (organisation), a socialist feminist organisation in Ireland that is part of the International Socialist Alternative

== See also ==
- Roza (disambiguation)
- Rosas (disambiguation)
- Rosawa, a village in Rajasthan, India, founded by the Rosa clan of Jat people
- Sub rosa, Latin idiom for "in confidence"
