= Barite rose =

Barite rose may refer to:

- Desert rose (crystal)

== See also ==
- Barite, a mineral
- Rose (disambiguation)
