= USS Albacore (SP-751) =

Patrol vessel of the United States Navy

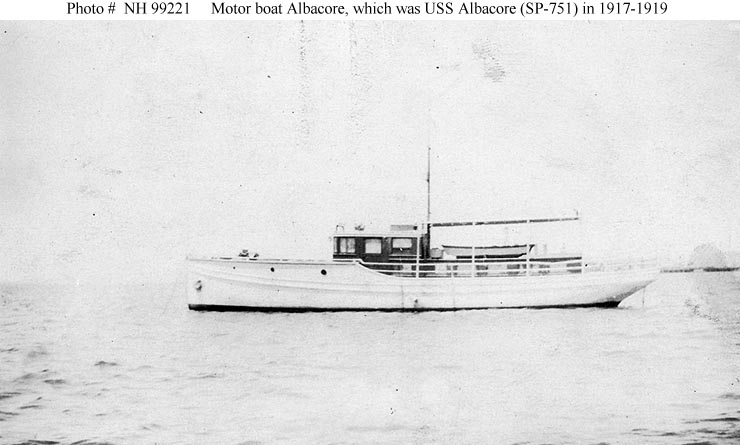
- Albacore as a private motorboat sometime between 1900 and 1917.

History

United States
- Name: USS Albacore
- Namesake: The albacore, a small tuna (previous name retained)
- Builder: Howard Brothers, San Diego, California
- Completed: 1900
- Acquired: 21 June 1917
- Commissioned: 1917
- Fate: Returned to owner 19 March 1919
- Notes: Operated as civilian motorboat Albacore 1900–1917 and from 1919

General characteristics
- Type: Patrol vessel
- Tonnage: 14 tons
- Length: 50 ft 8 in (15.44 m)
- Beam: 9 ft 6 in (2.90 m)
- Draft: 4 ft 7 in (1.40 m)
- Speed: 7 knots
- Armament: 1 × 1-pounder gun; 1 × machine gun

The first USS Albacore (SP-751) was a United States Navy patrol vessel in commission from 1917 to 1919.

Albacore was built as a civilian motorboat of the same name in 1900 by Howard Brothers at San Diego, California. The U.S. Navy acquired her from her owner, Bryant H. Howard of San Diego, in 1917 for World War I service as a patrol vessel. Ordered to be delivered to the Navy on 21 June 1917, she was commissioned soon thereafter as USS Albacore (SP-751).

Assigned to the 12th Naval District, Albacore operated on section patrol duty off California for the rest of World War I. She is known to have alternated between patrol and guard ship duty at San Diego with the patrol boat USS Nomad (SP-1046) throughout the summer of 1917. She also is known to have alternated between guard and patrol duty at San Diego ca. December 1917, rotating with Nomad and the patrol boats USS Normannia (SP-756), USS Rosa (SP-757), and occasionally USS Natalie Mae (SP-1005).

The Navy returned Albacore to her owner on 19 March 1919.
