= USS Nomad =

Patrol vessel of the United States Navy

History

United States
- Name: USS Nomad
- Namesake: Previous name retained
- Builder: Goulartte, San Diego, California
- Completed: 1914
- Acquired: May 1917
- Commissioned: 10 May 1917
- Fate: Returned to owner 9 June 1918
- Notes: Operated as private motorboat Nomad 1914-1917 and from 1918

General characteristics
- Type: Patrol vessel
- Length: 36 ft 7 in (11.15 m)
- Beam: 9 ft 6 in (2.90 m)
- Draft: 2 ft 6 in (0.76 m)
- Speed: 11 knots
- Armament: 1 × machine gun

USS Nomad (SP-1046) was a United States Navy patrol vessel in commission from 1917 to 1918.

Nomad was built as a private motorboat of the same name in 1914 by Goulartte at San Diego, California. In May 1917, the U.S. Navy chartered her from her owner, F. N. Howe of San Diego, for use as a section patrol boat during World War I. She was commissioned on 10 May 1917 as USS Nomad (SP-1046).

Assigned to the 12th Naval District, Nomad patrolled off San Diego in June 1917 and alternated between patrol and guard ship duty there throughout the summer of 1917, rotating with the patrol boat USS Albacore (SP-751). In September 1917, she assumed the additional duty of boarding vessel to help halt trade in contraband. Beginning in December 1917, Nomad alternated between guard and patrol duty, rotating with Albacore and the patrol boats USS Normannia (SP-756), USS Rosa (SP-757), and occasionally USS Natalie Mae (SP-1005). She assumed special duty with naval aviation on 4 February 1918 and continued outer patrols at San Diego into June 1918.

The Navy returned Nomad to her owner on 9 June 1918.
