= Rosas =

Rosas or Las Rosas may refer to:

- Rosas (surname), a Spanish surname, including a list of people with the name
- Rosas (Madrid), a ward in San Blas-Canillejas district, Madrid, Spain
- Rosas, Cauca, a town and municipality in Colombia
- Rosas (dance ensemble), a dance company founded by Anne Teresa De Keersmaeker in 1983
- "Rosas" (La Oreja de Van Gogh song), 2003
- "Rosas", a song by Ana Carolina from Dois Quartos, 2006
- "Rosas" (Nica del Rosario song), a song by Nica del Rosario that served as an anthem for Leni Robredo's 2022 presidential campaign
- Las Rosas (Madrid Metro), a metro station in San Blas, Madrid, Spain
- Las Rosas, Chiapas, a city in Mexico
- Las Rosas, Santa Fe, a city in Argentina
- A fictional island city-state from the Disney animated motion picture film Wish

== See also ==
- Rosa (disambiguation)
- Roses, Spain (Spanish: Rosas), a town in Catalonia, Spain
- Roses (disambiguation)
