= USS Natalie Mae =

United States patrol vessel during World War I

History

United States
- Name: USS Natalie Mae
- Namesake: Previous name retained
- Notes: In service ca. December 1917

General characteristics
- Type: Patrol vessel

USS Natalie Mae (SP-1005) was a United States Navy patrol vessel in commission during World War I.

Natalie Mae is known to have been assigned the section patrol number 1005 and to have operated on patrol duties in the 12th Naval District at San Diego, California, ca. December 1917 as USS Natalie Mae (SP-1005), occasionally in rotation with the patrol boats USS Albacore (SP-751), USS Normannia (SP-756), USS Rosa (SP-757), and USS Nomad (SP-1046). However, no other records of Natalie Mae's operational history have been found, nor have any records of her characteristics.
