= USS Normannia =

Patrol vessel of the United States Navy

History

United States
- Name: USS Normannia
- Namesake: Previous name retained
- Builder: Fellows Boat Works, San Diego, California
- Completed: 1912
- Acquired: 10 July 1917
- Commissioned: 10 July 1917
- Fate: Returned to owner 23 December 1918
- Notes: Operated as private motorboat Normannia 1912-1917 and from 1918

General characteristics
- Type: Patrol vessel
- Tonnage: 8 Gross register tons
- Length: 42 ft (13 m)
- Beam: 9 ft 6 in (2.90 m)
- Draft: 2 ft 9 in (0.84 m)
- Speed: 9 knots (17 km/h)
- Armament: 1 × 1-pounder gun; 1 × machine gun

USS Normannia (SP-756) was a United States Navy patrol vessel in commission from 1917 to 1918.

Normannia was built as a private motorboat of the same name in 1912 by Fellows Boat Works at San Diego, California. On 10 July 1917, the U.S. Navy acquired her under a free lease from her owner, F. Thum of Pasadena, California, for use as a section patrol boat during World War I. She was commissioned the same day as USS Normannia (SP-756).

Assigned to the 12th Naval District and based at San Francisco, California, Normannia operated on patrol duty for the rest of World War I, guarding the harbor entrance, protecting the coast between San Francisco and San Diego, and putting to sea for special duty on 13 August 1917. She is known to have alternated between guard and patrol duty at San Diego ca. December 1917, rotating with the patrol boats USS Albacore (SP-751), USS Rosa (SP-757), USS Nomad (SP-1046), and occasionally USS Natalie Mae (SP-1005).

The Navy returned Normannia to Thum on 23 December 1918.
