= Rosie the Riveter (disambiguation) =

Rosie the Riveter is a cultural icon representing the working women of the United States during World War II.

Rosie the Riveter may also refer to:

- Rosie the Riveter/World War II Home Front National Historical Park, a national park in the United States
- Rosie the Riveter (film), a 1944 film starring Jane Frazee
- "We Can Do It!", a wartime poster frequently referred to as "Rosie the Riveter"
- "Rosie the Riveter", a song by Suzy Bogguss from Song of America
- Rosie the Riveter, burlesque dancer during WWII and mother of Russ Tolman

== See also ==
- The Life and Times of Rosie the Riveter, a 1980 documentary film
- Rosie the Rocketer, scout attack airplane
- Rosie the Rocketeer, spaceflight test dummy
- Riveter
- Rivet (disambiguation)
- Rosie (disambiguation)
