= Spot (music festival) =

Annual music festival in Aarhus, Denmark

SPOT
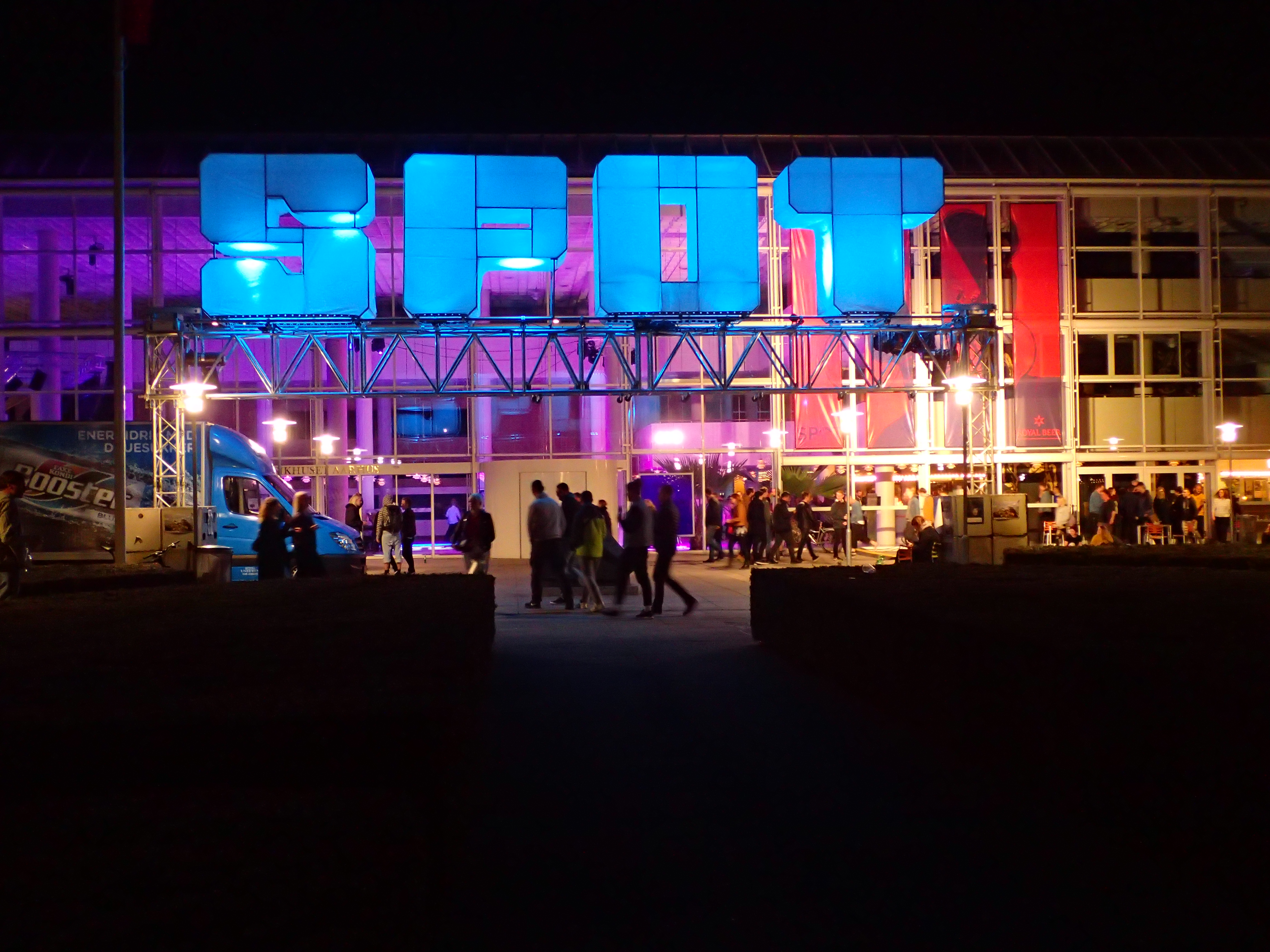
- Genre: Indie rock, pop, hip hop, electronica, world music, reggae etc.
- Dates: A few days in early May
- Locations: Aarhus, Denmark
- Years active: 1994–2000, 2002–present
- Website: http://www.spotfestival.dk

SPOT is an annual music festival in the city of Aarhus, Denmark, showcasing emerging Danish and Scandinavian musicians. Close to two hundred artists and bands from most genres of contemporary popular music—such as rock, hip hop and electronic music—play various stages across town, centered on the Academy of Music and concert halls of Musikhuset. Around 8,000 people attend the 100–200 concerts, including 1,500 from the music business, with close to a quarter of these from companies abroad.

Speakers also participate in panel discussions and give lectures on various music industry topics. For example, they answer musicians' questions on "How to make it in the US" and participate in debates on topics including file sharing and the future of the album.

While the audience is mainly local, one of its stated aims is to promote Danish and Scandinavian music to the international music business, from record companies and concert organisers to agents and the music press. The festival’s efforts to serve both local audiences and international music industry professionals have drawn criticism.

== History ==
Started in 1994 as a local initiative, SPOT festival has been organized by ROSA ("Dansk Rock Samråd", or Danish Rock Council in English), an umbrella organization representing various Danish musicians' unions, from 1995 onwards. In 2002, David Fricke of Rolling Stone spotted the Raveonettes at the festival and his subsequent endorsement was considered instrumental in landing them a contract with Columbia Records. This incident greatly increased interest in the festival among musicians as a "place to be seen", prompting among others Sort Sol, a staple of the Danish music scene since 1977, to appear the following year in the hope of garnering international interest in their back catalogue.

=== Selected performers ===
Bands that have performed at SPOT include

- 1997 (SPOT04): Kashmir (Denmark), moi Caprice (Denmark)
- 1998 (SPOT05): Under Byen (Denmark), Superheroes (Denmark)
- 1999 (SPOT06): Sigur Rós (Iceland)
- 2000 (SPOT07): Outlandish (Denmark)
- 2002 (SPOT08): The Raveonettes, Junior Senior (Denmark)
- 2003 (SPOT09): Kaizers Orchestra (Norway), The Blue Van (Denmark)
- 2004 (SPOT10): Múm (Iceland)
- 2005 (SPOT11): Blue Foundation (Denmark), Mew (Denmark)
- 2006 (SPOT12): Oh No Ono (Denmark), Figurines (Denmark)
- 2007 (SPOT13): Spleen United (Denmark), Shout Out Louds (Sweden), Eivør Pálsdóttir (Faroe Islands)

=== Growth and changing profile ===
In the 2000s, the festival increased the number of bands and venues, drawing both public attention and criticism. In 2005, the festival included 107 acts featured on 10 stages across town, a number that led the festival manager to call for scaling back. Critical voices have focused more on the choice of venues and artists, claiming that venues have been spread too far apart and the choice of musicians has gotten safer and less varied. Political interest in the festival has grown with the commercial successes of acts such as Mew, The Raveonettes and Junior Senior. In 2005, the minister for culture, Brian Mikkelsen, proclaimed it "the most important musical event in Denmark" due to its potential as a vehicle for "networking and musical export". However, this attention has prompted questions about the relative weights given to artistic merit and marketability as criteria for band selection and claims that the new focus on big business has alienated the local music scene. The inclusion of by now well-established names (or at least names that were felt to have had their chance of international recognition) such as Saybia and Outlandish was greeted with muted enthusiasm in the music press and occasional hostility from audiences.

In 2017, SPOT Festival was expanded to last three days with more than 200 events and was held in early May. As part of the expansion, several smaller festivals within the larger festival were arranged, including Roots & Hybrid focussing on world music and ethnic styles primarily from the Middle East, Aarhus Volume with local hip-hop musicians, Mono goes Metal with local acts from the metal underground, and Spot on Greenland with emerging bands from Greenland. Film and fashion also became part of SPOT, with two small festivals featuring local fashion companies and filmmakers.

The 2018 festival was expanded to last five days. The Roots & Hybrid festival continued.

SPOT Festival celebrated its 25th anniversary in 2019. The festival reverted to a three-day event, but now with many small music events throughout the year. The Roots & Hybrids festival within the festival continued.

== See also ==
- A Switch Box Tale, part of 2008 event
