= Desert rose =

Desert rose may refer to:

== Plants ==
- Adenium, a genus of flowering plants in tropical Africa and Arabia
- Rosa stellata, a flowering plant native to North America
- Sturt’s desert rose (Gossypium sturtianum), an Australian shrub related to cotton

== Other uses ==
- Desert rose (crystal), a rosette formation of gypsum and barite with sand inclusions
- "Desert Rose" (Sting song), a song on Sting's 1999 album Brand New Day
- "Desert Rose" (Eric Johnson song), a song on Eric Johnson's 1990 album Ah Via Musicom
- Desert Rose Academy Charter School, a public charter high school in Tucson, Arizona
- The Desert Rose Band, a country rock band founded by Chris Hillman, Herb Pedersen, and John Jorgenson
- Desert Rose ~ The Snow Apocalypse
  砂の薔薇（デザート・ローズ） 「雪の黙示録」 (Suna no Bara (Desert Rose) – Yuki no Mokushiroku) , a Japanese manga and OVA
- A pattern of Franciscan Ceramics dinnerware
- Desert Rose: The Life and Legacy of Coretta Scott King, a biography written by King's sister Edythe Scott Bagley
