= Human–animal marriage =

Marriage between an animal and a human

Human–animal marriage is a marriage between a human and a non-human animal. This topic has appeared in mythology and magical fiction. In the 21st century, there have been numerous reports from around the world of humans marrying their pets and other animals. Human–animal marriage is often seen in accordance with zoophilia, although they are not necessarily linked. Although animal-human marriage is not mentioned specifically in national laws, the act of engaging in sexual acts with an animal is illegal in many countries under animal abuse laws.

== Folklore ==
The practice of animal-human marriage has made appearances in folklore and several mythological stories where it is often understood to mean a deity-human marriage involving gods or heroes. Many tribes of the Native Americans in the United States trace the origin of humanity to marriages between other animals and humans. The indigenous Cheyenne have a story of animal-human marriage in "The Girl who Married a Dog". In other Native American myths, animal spirits frequently assume human form. In many cases they are not seen as literal animals, but representatives from the animal kingdom. The Chinese folktale "The Goddess of the Silkworm" is an example of a tale where a woman marries a horse. A similar Irish legend tells of a king who marries a horse, symbolizing a divine union between the king and the goddess of the land.

The most famous animal-as-bridegroom story that has survived in modern times is Beauty and the Beast by Gabrielle-Suzanne de Villeneuve. According to Bernard Sergent, "human–animal marriage is a union that is too remote as incest is a too close one. Compared to a balanced marriage, between humans but from another clan or another village, that is to say–depending on the society–within the framework of a well measured endogamy or exogamy, incest transgresses the norm because it is an exaggerated endogamy, and animal marriage transgresses it because it is an exaggerated exogamy."

== Cases ==
In many, if not most, jurisdictions, there is no legal precedent for marrying another animal, however; several individuals claim to have done so.

In 1992, an American man named Mark Matthews married his horse. He wrote a memoir describing the concealment of his zoophilia from his Methodist family.

In 2005, an American man ordained with the Universal Life Church married humans and their pets.

A British woman who married her dog created the website MarryYourPet.com, after she became ordained to marry humans with their pets, and has performed about 100 ceremonies.

In 2005, another British woman reportedly married a dolphin.

The Sudanese goat marriage incident made headlines in 2006, when a man was forced to marry a goat after being caught in a sexual interaction with it.

Other reports of marriage include animals such as dogs, cats, frogs, and a dolphin.

Other incidents of human animal relations took place in 2010, when 18-year-old Balinese man Ngurah Alit was found having sexual intercourse with a cow, who he claimed flirted with him. As part of a Pecaruan ritual, the man was forced to marry the animal. The ceremony was thought to cleanse the village of the immoral act of bestiality. The cow was drowned in the ocean, while Alit's clothes were symbolically submerged in the sea as well.

In 2013, a Brazilian man reportedly married a goat in a Satanic church after his plan was rejected by his evangelical church.

In 2014, internet hoaxer Paul Horner staged a ceremony where he married his pet dog at the Chapel of Our Lady at the Presidio in San Francisco. Many news outlets reported the incident as reality.

== See also ==
- Pet humanization
- Choupette
- Human bonding
- Human-animal hybrid
- Selkie
- Speciesism
- Anthrozoology
- Zoophilia
- Vase de Noces
