= Zimmer Biomet Robotics =

- Industry: Medical Devices
- Founded: 2002
- Founder: Bertin Nahum, Founder & President (2002-2017)
- Headquarters: Montpellier, France
- Products: Rosa Knee; Rosa One Brain; Rosa One Spine
- Website: www.zimmerbiomet.com/en/products-and-solutions/zb-edge/robotics.html

Zimmer Biomet Robotics, formerly Medtech SA, is a robotic surgery company founded in 2002 by Bertin Nahum and based in Montpellier, France (Hérault department, in southern France. This company designs, develops and markets robotic assistance for surgical procedures of the central nervous system and other applications such as the knee.

The company went public in a November 2013 with an initial public offering on Euronext Paris. Its ticker symbol and flagship product is ROSA, a robotic surgical assistant designed for minimally-invasive surgery.

Its pre-IPO investors include Newfund, which had acquired 27 percent of Medtech's capital in 2010, Soridec, and Midi Capital.

== History ==
The first surgical robot developed by Medtech, in partnership with the Montpellier Laboratory of Computer Science, Robotics and Microelectronics (LIRMM), was BRIGIT, a robot dedicated to knee surgery. In 2006, Zimmer, the world leader in orthopedic implants, bought BRIGIT’s entire patent portfolio.

Medtech decided to reinvest those resources in the development of a new robotic-assisted technology. Medtech’s first ROSA robot, ROSA Brain, dedicated to neurosurgery was thus designed. Comparable to a "GPS" for the brain, the robot can be used for any type of cranial procedures requiring surgical planning with preoperative data, patient registration and precise positioning and handling of instruments.

Pathologies covered by the use of ROSA Brain include epilepsy, Parkinson's disease, generalized dystonia, cavernoma, hydrocephalus.

The ROSA Brain device is present in 120 hospitals across Europe, North America, Asia and the Middle East and has been used in more than 9 000 surgical procedures.

In July 2014, Medtech announced the CE Marking of its new product ROSA Spine, allowing it to be marketed in Europe.

On November 28, 2013, Medtech was listed on the French stock Exchange operated by Euronext (NYSE Euronext, compartment C).

In 2016, Medtech obtained the CE marking for its new product ROSA One, a robotic assistive device for minimally invasive surgery of the brain and the spine in the same platform.

In July 2016, Medtech was acquired by the Zimmer Biomet Group and became as known as Zimmer Biomet Robotics.
