= Flower preservation =

Preservation techniques

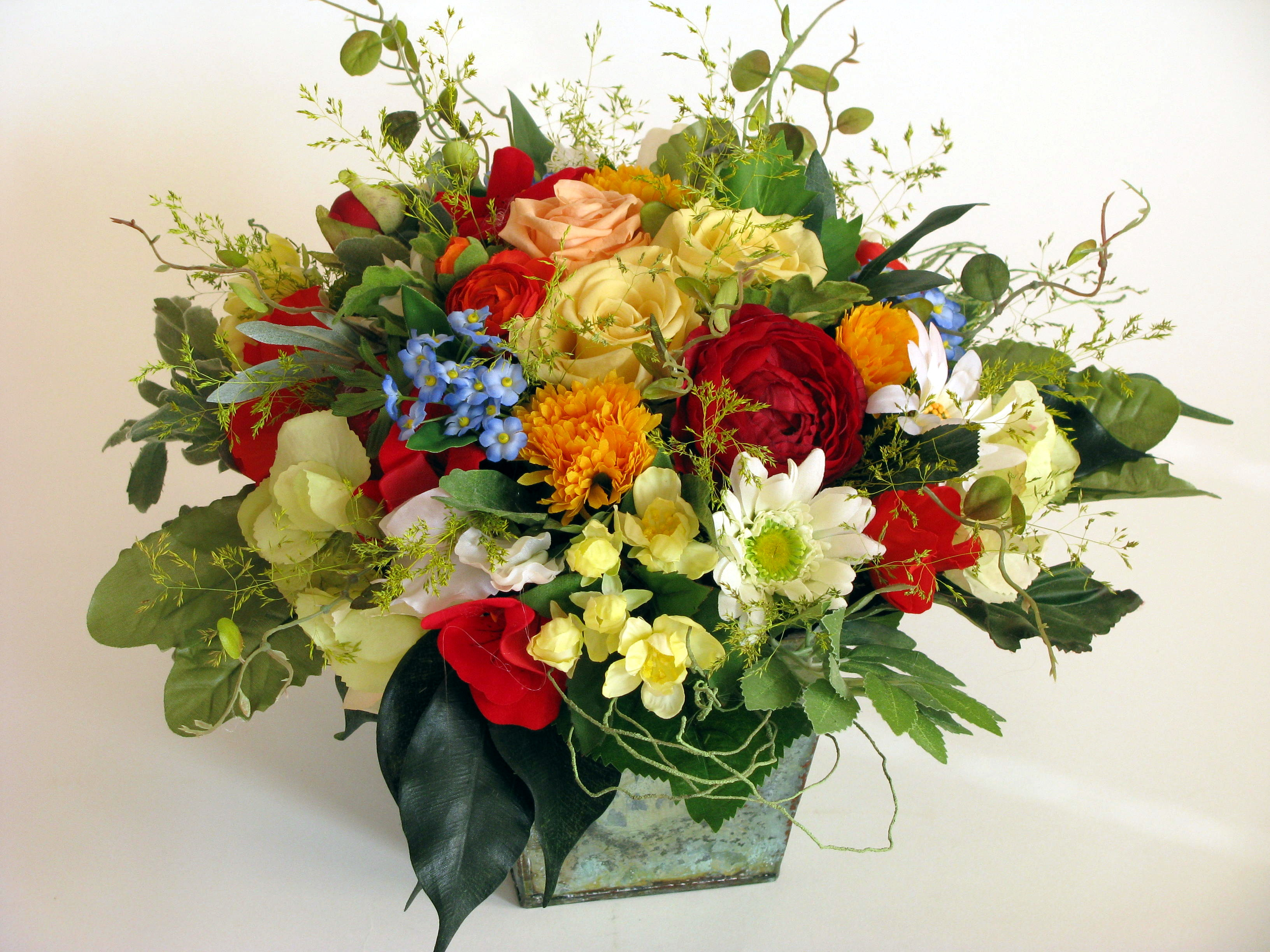
Preserved rose blossoms and silk flowers

Flower preservation has existed since early history, although deliberate flower preservation is a more recent phenomenon. In the Middle East, the bones of pre-historic man were discovered with delicate wild flowers probably as a tribute to a passing loved one. Evidence of deliberate use of specific flowers is indicated by the pollen grains that were present. Brightly colored and vivid flowers were also found in Egyptian tombs. These flowers were approximated to be 4,000 years old. In the sixteenth century, medicinal nosegays began to give way to ornamental ones. Flowers essentially started to be used for decorative purposes such as jewels, fans and gloves. During the Elizabethan Age, the once familiar ruff was replaced by soft lacy collars, and bosom flowers also became popular.

== Drying ==
One of the earliest techniques used to preserve flowers is air drying. Many plant species are capable of retaining their general shape and coloration when left to dry naturally in ambient conditions.

Another method involves the use of glycerine, which helps maintain the flexibility and longevity of the preserved plant material. For effective preservation, the plant is fully hydrated before treatment. A solution is prepared using a mixture of tepid water and glycerine, typically in a 2:1 ratio. The use of warm water aids in dissolving the glycerine and enhances absorption. However, this technique is not effective when foliage has already begun to display autumnal coloration.

Pressing is a widely used method that results in flattened specimens, often used for botanical studies or decorative purposes. This process is also known as Oshibana. The process typically involves placing flowers between sheets of unglazed paper, such as newsprint or pages from a telephone book, ensuring that individual specimens do not overlap. Multiple layers are often stacked and pressed under a flat, heavy object. The drying phase varies depending on the species and moisture content, but generally ranges from two to four weeks.

== Modern preservation methods ==
=== Hanging flowers in ventilated area ===
There are several air-drying methods used for different kinds of flowers. The easiest and most effective way to dry most flowers is to tie them in small bundles with twine, raffia or ribbons, and hang them upside down, out of direct sunlight in a warm, well-ventilated place. Bunches should contain one type of flower. Large flowers are dried individually. The leaves stripped as soon as possible after picking. They retain moisture and slow down the drying process. Wall hooks, poles or wires are placed at least 15 centimetres (6 in) from the ceiling. Heads should be staggered to allow plenty of air to circulate, preventing mildew and rot. It may be necessary to retie bunches or individual flowers halfway through the drying process, because the stems tend to shrink as they dry.

The drying phase can range from one week to several weeks depending on the type of material, when and where it was harvested and the humidity of the place it is drying. The stems of hung flowers tend to dry unnaturally straight and the flowers become very brittle.

Suggested flowers to air dry include: strawflowers, goldenrod, Hydrangeas, Celosia (crested and plumed types), globe amaranth, Salvia, Xeranthemum and many of the "everlastings".

=== Hot air drying in drying chamber ===
Compact flowers like marigolds, chrysanthemums, cornflowers and zinnias dry well in a fan-assisted, convection chamber. Non-ventilated chambers are not suitable, since they generate too much moisture. The material must be dried at a low temperature (30-35˚Celsius), over many hours. The flowers are slotted through holes in a wire mesh rack leaving room for the stems to dangle below. The time required depends upon the density of the flowers.

=== Silica gel drying ===
Another trend is silica gel. Its initial cost is greater than that of borax-sand or borax-cornmeal combinations, but silica gel can be used over and over for many years. Silica gel dries flowers quickly, so it can be used to dry more flowers during a single season than the same quantity of a borax mixture. Silica gel is available under a number of trade names. It is white, but some types contain blue crystals that act as an indicator of the amount of moisture which has been absorbed. When these crystals are clear blue, the material is dry. As moisture is absorbed from the flowers, the crystals gradually turn pink. At that point, it is time to re-dry the crystals before using them again.

To dry the material, silica gel is spread on open pans or cookie sheets in a layer 10–20 mm (1/2–3/4 in) thick. Materials to be preserved are then baked in an oven at 250˚Celsius for about an hour, or until the moisture-indicating crystals, if present, are blue again. Material is then stirred several times while drying.

Flowers dried in silica gel must be placed in airtight containers. If a container is not sealed tightly, the silica gel absorbs moisture from the air, and flowers dry too slowly or not at all. A candy tin, plastic container, coffee can, large-mouth jar or any other container with a tight-fitting lid may be used. If no containers with tight lids are available, loose tops should be sealed with tape. Silica gel is especially useful for drying fragile plants and flowers with delicate colors. Flowers that dry best in silica gel are allium, anemone, cornflower, roses, tulip and zinnia.

=== Molecular sieve ===
Molecular sieve is a material containing tiny pores of a precise and uniform size that is used as an absorbent for gases and liquids. They are metal alumino silicates which have a crystalline structure consisting of an assembly of tetrahedral. The tetrahedral are made up of four oxygen atoms which occupy the summits surrounding either one silicon atom or an aluminium atom placed in the center. Compensating cations (sodium, potassium) make the hole electrically neutral. The hole forms an assembly of small cells (or pores) of uniform and known size, in which a molecule of smaller size can be trapped by the phenomenon known as absorption.

To ensure the dehydration of the fresh natural flowers, the mixture of organic solvents is poured onto the hole until the level exceeds the level of the flowers by about 2 cm (0.79 in). The water molecules are progressively absorbed into the small cells or pores of the molecular sieve. The receptacle is closed hermetically for a few days. Once dried, the flower reabsorbs a little moisture of atmospheric origin, and this increases its suppleness and its plasticity.

As molecular sieve relates to the long-term preservation and treatment of cut flowers for long duration, (i.e., continually maintaining their decorative properties), Vermont Flowers has been using this method of preserving flowers instead of the traditional silica gel more than 20 years ago. The advantage was a much more professional regeneration of the molecular sieves. Flowers which are particularly suitable for such a treatment are roses, peonies, camellias, marigolds, globe flowers, orchids, dahlias, carnations, phloxes, summer chrysanthemums, hollyhocks, and the like, and other species with many petals or a fairly rigid structure.

=== Freeze drying ===
Originally introduced in 1813 by William Hyde Wollaston to the Royal Society in London, it was not until the late 1980's the freeze-drying industry discovered the allurement and longevity of freeze-dried flowers. Freeze-dried flowers are fresh flowers that have been specially dried to preserve their natural shape and color. Freeze drying is accomplished by a process called sublimation. It requires a special freeze-drying machine.

It involves first freezing the flowers at 100K for at least 12 hours. A vacuum pump slowly pulls the moisture out of the flowers as a vapor in one chamber, and then the vapor condenses as ice in another chamber. As a result of this process, the shape and natural color of the flower is maintained. It has been found that certain flowers retain their color well despite the fact they have been freeze-dried. Such flowers retain their color due to the tissue composition of the petals, leaves, and the like. Roses, carnations, African violets, asparagus and other ferns, and baby's breath exhibit good color retention notwithstanding the dehydration during the freeze-drying process. Those floral pieces which either dull or fade from dehydration may be given color by utilization of a florist's spray tint. This spray coloring restores the lost color which, in the sealed environment of the glass container of the final product, retains its given color along with the natural color of the other pieces.

=== Flower press ===
This floral preservation has its roots in Victorian times, but has also been brought into the current list of Floral Preservation because of new techniques of pressing, vacuum sealing and color enhancing. This method uses a "flower press" that squeezes the flower between two rigid layers, often lined with a breathable/adsorbent fabric to allow moisture to leave the flower, then applies a small amount of pressure to the flower, letting it keep its shape while it dries. The art is then framed in a flat shadow box style frame, to hang on the wall. Vacuum sealing the art is recommended and the use of Museum Quality glass with a UV Factor of 97% to ensure the colors last.

=== Preservation in a resin pour ===
A resin pour preservation allows for flowers like roses to be preserved in a clear transparent mould, making this method a great choice for ornamental preservation of flowers. Two separate resin elements are mixed in equal proportions and poured into a silicone mould, often in an ice cube shape, with the flower inserted. With each pour, a heat gun is used to remove air bubbles that form at the surface of the pour. Those attempting a resin pour preservation are recommended to wear a respirator and gloves as a resin pour can give off fumes and considerable heat. The preservation of real dried flowers can also be done within a bezel-based structure poured with resin.
