= Roser =

Roser may refer to:

- Roser (name), including a list of people with the name
  - Roser (singer) (born 1979), Spanish singer
- Roser Park Historic District, St. Petersburg, Florida
- Studio Roser, a theater in Baden-Württemberg, Germany
- Roser (Krøyer), an 1893 painting by P. S. Krøyer
- 2856 Röser, a minor planet

== See also ==
- Rose (disambiguation)
