= Judge Rose =

Judge Rose may refer to:

- John Carter Rose (1861–1927), judge of the United States Court of Appeals for the Fourth Circuit
- Stephanie M. Rose (born 1972), judge of the United States District Court for the Southern District of Iowa
- Thomas M. Rose (born 1948), judge of the United States District Court for the Southern District of Ohio

== See also ==
- Justice Rose (disambiguation)
