= Corn rose =

Corn rose may refer to:

== Plants ==
- Agrostemma, also known as corn cockle
- Papaver rhoeas, also known as corn poppy

== Other ==
- Corn Rose, a cargo ship; see Cornships Management and Agency

== See also ==
- Cornrows
- Rose (disambiguation)
