= Roze =

Roze may refer to:

== People ==
- Janis Roze, herpetologist
- Jean Roze, French textile producer
- Pierre-Gustave Roze (1812–1862), French naval commander
- Ernest Roze, French mycologist; see Marasmiaceae
- Magdalena Roze, Australian meteorologist
- Marie Roze, French singer
- Mārtiņš Roze, Latvian politician
- Nicolas Roze, French composer
- Nicolas Roze (chevalier), French aristocrat
- Pascale Roze, French playwright
- Raymond Rôze, English composer
- Roze, a pseudonym used by DJ Tiësto

== Other uses ==
- Róże, a village in Poland

== See also ==
- Rose (disambiguation)
