= USS Rosa =

Patrol vessel of the United States Navy

History

United States
- Name: USS Rosa
- Namesake: Previous name retained
- Builder: Jensen, San Diego, California
- Completed: 1909
- Acquired: 29 June 1917
- Commissioned: 17 May 1917
- Decommissioned: ca. 17 December 1918
- Fate: Returned to owner 6 January 1919
- Notes: Operated as private motorboat Rosa 1909-1917 and from 1919

General characteristics
- Type: Patrol vessel
- Tonnage: 19 Gross register tons
- Length: 48 ft (15 m)
- Beam: 9 ft 10 in (3.00 m)
- Draft: 4 ft 6 in (1.37 m)
- Speed: 9 knots (17 km/h)
- Complement: 7
- Armament: 1 × 1-pounder gun; 1 × machine gun

USS Rosa (SP-757) was a United States Navy patrol vessel in commission from 1917 to 1918.

Rosa was built as a private wooden motorboat of the same name in 1909 by Jensen at San Diego, California. In 1917, the U.S. Navy acquired her from her owner, Jack Merrill of Coronado, California, for use as a section patrol boat during World War I. She was commissioned on 17 May 1917 as USS Rosa (SP-757), although the Navy did not actually take delivery of her from Merrill until 29 June 1917, when she entered service.

Assigned to duty in San Diego Harbor, Rosa conducted patrols, provided minor transportation services, and conducted salvage operations for the rest of World War I. Ca. December 1917, she is known to have alternated between guard and patrol duty at San Diego on rotation with the patrol boats USS Albacore (SP-751), USS Normannia (SP-756), USS Nomad (SP-1046), and occasionally USS Natalie Mae (SP-1005).

Rosa was decommissioned around 17 December 1918 and was returned to Merrill on 6 January 1919.
