= Rose (Doctor Who) =

In the context of Doctor Who, Rose may refer to:

== Characters ==
- Rose Tyler, companion of the Doctor in series one and two, played by Billie Piper
- Rose Noble, character in the 2023 specials, played by Yasmin Finney

== Other ==
- "Rose" (Doctor Who episode), series one episode one (2005), which introduced Rose Tyler
- Rose, dog belonging to the parallel universe version of Jackie Tyler in "Rise of the Cybermen" (2006)

== See also ==
- Rosita (Doctor Who)
- Rosa (Doctor Who)
