= Rosé (disambiguation) =

Rosé is a style of wine.

Rosé may also refer to:

== Music ==
- Rosé (album), an album by Bran Van 3000
- "Rosé" (song), a song by the Feeling
- Rosé Quartet, a string quartet formed by Arnold Rosé in 1882

== People ==
- Rosé (singer) (born 1997), New Zealand and South Korean singer; member of South Korean girl group Blackpink
- Rosé (drag queen) (born 1989), Scottish-American drag queen and singer
- Rosé (surname), includes a list of people with the surname Rosé

== Fictional ==
- Rosé Thomas, a character of Fullmetal Alchemist
- Super Saiyan Rosé, a transformation used by Goku Black in Dragon Ball Super

== See also ==
- Rose (disambiguation)
