= Tokyo Rose (disambiguation) =

Tokyo Rose was a catchphrase used by Allied troops for English-speaking female broadcasters of Japanese propaganda during World War II, particularly to refer to Iva Toguri D'Aquino.

Tokyo Rose may also refer to:

- Tokyo Rose (album), an album by Van Dyke Parks
- Tokyo Rose (band), a rock band from New Jersey
- "Tokyo Rose" (song), a 1995 song by Akina Nakamori
- "Tokyo Rose", a song by Canadian group Idle Eyes
- "Tokyo Rose", a song by Chapman Whitney from the album Chapman Whitney Streetwalkers
- Tokyo Rose, a garbage train car used by the Toronto Transit Commission and made by Nippon Sharyo (1968)
- Tokyo Rose (film), a 1946 film
- Tokyo Rose, the United States F-13 Superfortress aircraft which conducted the 1 November 1944 reconnaissance sortie over Japan
