= Rosey =

Rosey can refer to:

== People ==
- Roosevelt Rosey Brown (1932–2004), American National Football League player
- Rosey Chan, British artist and musician
- Roosevelt Rosey Davis (born 1941), American professional football player
- Roosevelt Rosey Davis (baseball) (1904–1968), American professional baseball pitcher
- Sam Dolan (1884–1944), American college football player and coach
- Rosey Edeh (born 1966), Canadian television personality
- Rosey Effiong (born 2001), American sprinter
- Gabrielle Rose Rosey Fletcher (born 1975), American Olympic snowboarder
- Rosey Grant, British meteorologist
- Roosevelt Rosey Grier (born 1932), American National Football League player, actor and minister
- Rosey Jones, Australian actress
- Rosey Metz (born 2001), Dutch swimmer
- Rosey E. Pool (1905–1971), Dutch writer, poet, educator and translator
- William Rosenbaum (1889–1949), American politician
- Albert Rosey Rowswell (1884–1955), American Major League Baseball radio sportscaster
- Roosevelt Taylor (born 1937), American former National Football League player
- Rosey Yunus (born 1956), Malaysian politician and teacher
- Rosey (wrestler) (1970–2017), WWE ring name of professional wrestler Matthew Anoa'i

== Other uses ==
- Institut Le Rosey, prestigious international boarding school in Switzerland
- Rosey, Haute-Saône, commune of the Haute-Saône département in France
- Rosey, Saône-et-Loire, commune of the Saône-et-Loire département in France
- "Rosey 105", a former branding of American radio station KRSK-FM

== See also ==
- Rosie (disambiguation)
- Rosy (disambiguation)
