= Rosie =

Rosie may refer to:

== Places ==
- Rosie, Arkansas, an unincorporated community
- Rosie River, Northern Territory, Australia

== People and fictional characters ==
- Rosie (given name), including a list of people and fictional characters
- Evan Mackie (1917–1986), New Zealand Second World War fighter ace nicknamed "Rosie"
- Rosie Thomas (writer), pen name of British journalist and romance novelist Janey King (born 1947)
- Rosie the Riveter, a World War II character used to encourage women to work on the home front
- Rosie the Rocketeer (a.k.a. "Rosie"), a Boeing spaceflight test dummy

== Film ==
- Rosie (1965 film), an Indian Malayalam film starring Prem Nazir
- Rosie!, a 1967 film starring Rosalind Russell
- Rosie (1998 film), a Belgian film
- Rosie (2013 film), a Swiss film
- Rosie (2018 film), an Irish film
- Rosie (2022 film), a Canadian film

== Television ==
- Rosie (TV series), a 1970s BBC TV police series
- Rosie Awards, the Alberta Film and Television Awards

== Music ==
=== Groups ===
- Rosie and the Originals, an American 1960s musical group
- Rosie, a 1970s band of singer David Lasley

=== Albums ===
- Rosie (Fairport Convention album), an album by British band Fairport Convention (1973)
- Rosie, an album by John Parish (2000)
- Rosie (Rosé album), an album by New Zealand and South Korean singer Rosé (2024)

=== Songs ===
- "Rosie", from the musical Bye Bye Birdie, 1960
- "Rosie", a single by Chubby Checker, 1964
- "Rosie", by Don Partridge, 1968
- "Rosie", by Argent on their album In Deep, 1973
- "Rosie", title song of the Fairport Convention album, 1973
- "Rosie", by Tom Waits, 1973
- "Rosie", by Jackson Browne from his album Running on Empty, 1977
- "Rosalita (Come Out Tonight)", a song by Bruce Springsteen, often referred to as "Rosie", 1973
- "Rosie" (Joan Armatrading song), 1979
- "Rosie", by Bill Morrissey, 1984
- "Rosie", by Richie Sambora, 1991
- "Rosie", by Claw Boys Claw, 1992
- "Rosie", by The Mollys, 1998
- "Rosie", by Daisy Dares You, 2010
- "Rosie", by The Kooks, 2011
- "Rosie", by Passenger, 2019

== Other uses ==
- Tropical Storm Rosie, tropical cyclones named Rosie
- Rosie the Riveter (disambiguation)
- Rosie the Elephant, an Asian elephant
- Rosie the Rocketer, scout attack aircraft
- Rosie, renamed short-lived version of McCall's magazine

== See also ==
- Rose (disambiguation)
- Rosey (disambiguation)
- Rosy (disambiguation)
- Valea Roşie (disambiguation)
