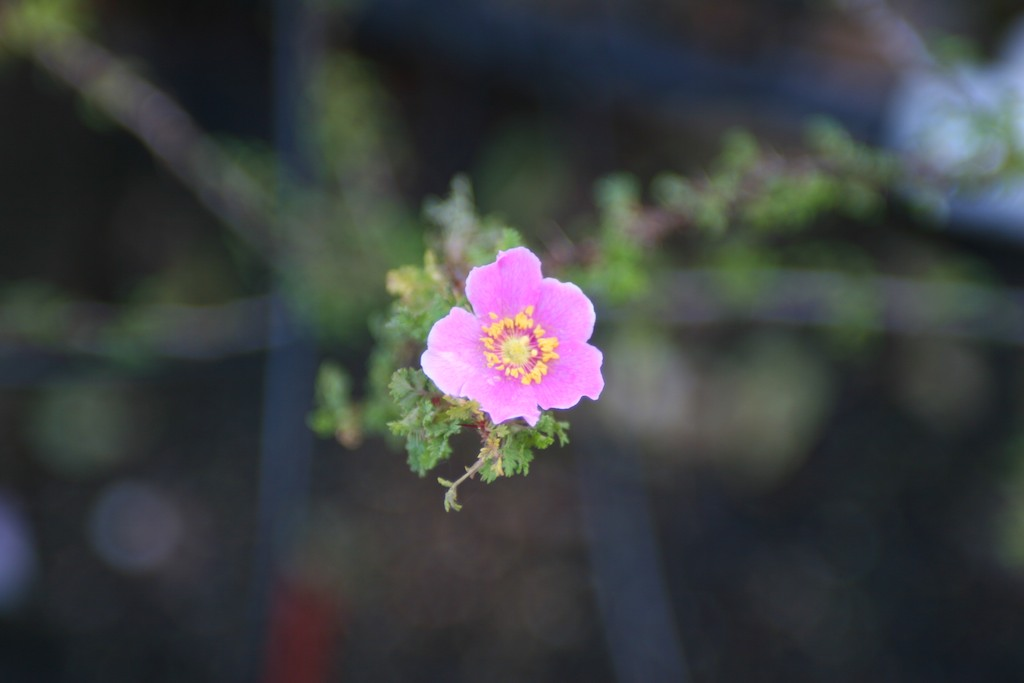
- ssp. mirifica

Conservation status
- Apparently Secure (NatureServe)

Scientific classification
- Kingdom: Plantae
- Clade: Tracheophytes
- Clade: Angiosperms
- Clade: Eudicots
- Clade: Rosids
- Order: Rosales
- Family: Rosaceae
- Genus: Rosa
- Species: R. stellata

Binomial name
- Rosa stellata Woot.

= Rosa stellata =

Species of flowering plant

Rosa stellata is a species of rose known by the common names desert rose, gooseberry rose, and star rose. In Texas this type of rose grows on dry rocky places to 6,500 feet (2,000 m), such as the Trans-Pecos. It occurs in the mountain canyons of Arizona and New Mexico. It also grows in dry, rocky places. It has trifoliate leaves, deep rose purple blossoms and yellowish white prickles on the petioles and stems. It is a perennial shrub with velvety, deciduous leaves. Some horticulturists consider it to be a browse plant.

Rosa stellata can be used as a groundcover or small shrub and grows best when partially exposed to sunlight. The purple flowers bloom in the summer and it typically grows to be between 16 and 24 inches tall. It attracts native bees and bumble bees. Native bees also use the plant for nesting materials.
