= Justice Rose =

Justice Rose may refer to:

- Christopher Rose (judge) (born 1937), judge on the Court of Appeal of England and Wales
- Herschel H. Rose (1877–1945), justice of the Supreme Court of Appeals of West Virginia
- Robert E. Rose (1939–2022), associate justice of the Supreme Court of Nevada
- Robert R. Rose Jr. (1915–1997), justice of the Wyoming Supreme Court
- Roderick Rose (1838–1903), associate justice of the Supreme Court of the Dakota Territory
- William B. Rose (1862–1946), justice of the Nebraska Supreme Court
- Vivien Rose, Lady Rose of Colmworth (fl. 1980s–2020s), judge on the Supreme Court of the United Kingdom

== See also ==
- Judge Rose (disambiguation)
