= Sudanese goat marriage incident =

Case of punishment for sexual activity with a goat

In 2006, a South Sudanese man named Charles Tombe was forced to "marry" a goat with which he was caught engaging in sexual activity, in the Hai Malakal suburb of Juba, at the time part of Sudan. The owner of the goat subdued the perpetrator and asked village elders to consider the matter. One elder noted that he and the other elders found the perpetrator, tied up by the owner, at the door of the goat shed. The goat's owner reported that, "They said I should not take him to the police, but rather let him pay a dowry for my goat because he used it as his wife." The perpetrator was thus ordered to "marry" the goat, pay the cost of the goat and pay a dowry of SD 15,000 (equating to US$50 in 2006, the GDP per capita was US$1,522 for 2008), with half of the dowry up front. The goat apparently acquired the name "Rose" during the elders' deliberations as part of a joke.

On 3 May 2007, it was reported that the goat had died, having choked on a plastic bag. The goat was survived by a four-month-old male kid. In November 2013, the South Sudan Law Society called for a review of all South Sudan's laws to abolish bizarre or cruel practices under customary law, such as "a man being forced to marry a goat called 'Rose' after deflowering her."

== Press attention ==
The story, first published on 24 February 2006 on the BBC website, attracted media attention and was republished on numerous newspapers, blogs, and other websites. Even a year after publication, the story was consistently among the BBC's 10 most emailed articles, with many visitors to the BBC news site passing the tale on to friends. The story received over 100,000 hits on five successive days long after its original publication and was read by millions of people. The BBC, astonished at this popularity, wondered if there was a campaign to keep the tale at the top of its rankings; however, an investigation by its senior software engineer, Gareth Owen, determined that the demand was genuine.

The BBC honoured the goat with a mock obituary when it died in 2007. The death was also reported in many other news outlets, including The Times and Fox News.

== See also ==
- Human–animal marriage
