= USS Rose =

Tugboat of the United States Navy

History

United States
- Ordered: as Ai Fitch
- Laid down: date unknown
- Launched: date unknown
- Acquired: 12 December 1863
- Commissioned: 8 February 1864
- Decommissioned: circa 1865
- Stricken: 3 March 1883
- Fate: Sold on 20 September 1883

General characteristics
- Displacement: 96 tons
- Length: 84 ft (26 m)
- Beam: 18 ft 2 in (5.54 m)
- Depth of hold: 7 ft 3 in (2.21 m)
- Propulsion: steam engine; screw-propelled
- Speed: not known
- Complement: not known
- Armament: one 20-pounder Parrott rifle

USS Rose was a screw steamer acquired by the Union Navy during the American Civil War.

She was used by the Union Navy as a tugboat and ammunition ship in support of the Union Navy blockade of Confederate waterways.

== Commissioned in New York City as a tugboat in 1864 ==
The wooden screw steamer Ai Fitch was purchased by the Navy on 12 December 1863 from Laurence Fitch, New York City; fitted out for service as a tug; and commissioned on 8 February 1864.

== Civil War service ==
=== Supporting McClellan’s Peninsula Campaign ===
Ordered to New Orleans, Louisiana, to join the West Gulf Blockading Squadron, she departed New York City soon after commissioning and proceeded to Hampton Roads, Virginia, where she was detained to support Major General Benjamin Butler's Army of the James up the James River at the beginning of the Bermuda Hundred Campaign on 4 May.

On 5 May she got underway to tow the monitor USS Tecumseh up the James River to support Union Army forces converging on Petersburg, Virginia. Remaining on the river well into June, she performed towing duties, tender services, and carried ammunition and powder up from City Point, Virginia. On the 24th she returned to Hampton Roads and prepared to resume her cruise to the Gulf of Mexico.

=== Reassigned to the Gulf of Mexico ===
Rose departed Hampton Roads on 26 July and arrived in Mississippi Sound on 5 August. After receiving a second gun, a heavy 12-pounder, she proceeded to Mobile Bay where she remained into September.

She then shifted back to Mississippi Sound where she added patrol duty to her other duties. In December she captured a small vessel laden with turpentine.

In late February 1865, Rose steamed to New Orleans, Louisiana; repaired; and in mid-April returned to Mobile, Alabama, to assist in clearing channels in the bay. During April, she struck a Confederate mine in Mobile Bay and sank with the loss of two men killed and three wounded, but she was refloated and repaired and returned to service. She remained in the Mobile area performing tug service into the fall, then shifted to Pensacola, Florida, where, being retained for service after the Civil War, she was assigned to the Pensacola Navy Yard.

== Post-war decommissioning and sale ==
Rose was struck from the Navy list on 3 March 1883 and sold on 20 September 1883.

== See also ==
- Union Blockade
