= Rosy (disambiguation) =

Rosy is a feminine given name or nickname. It may also refer to:

- Rosy, Poland, a village in Lublin Voivodeship
- Rosy, Minnesota, United States, an unincorporated community
- Rosie (1965 film), an Indian Malayalam film (also transliterated as Rosy)
- Rosy (film), a 2018 American film
- "Rosy", a song by Loona from Olivia Hye

== See also ==
- Rosey (disambiguation)
- Rosie (disambiguation)
