= The Rose of Tralee =

(The) Rose of Tralee may refer to:

- Rose of Tralee (festival), International festival held annually in Tralee, County Kerry
- Rose of Tralee (1937 film), a British film directed by Oswald Mitchell
- Rose of Tralee (1942 film), a British film directed by Germain Burger
- "The Rose of Tralee" (song), 19th-century Irish ballad
