= Gold-dipped roses =

Roses preserved in a coating of gold

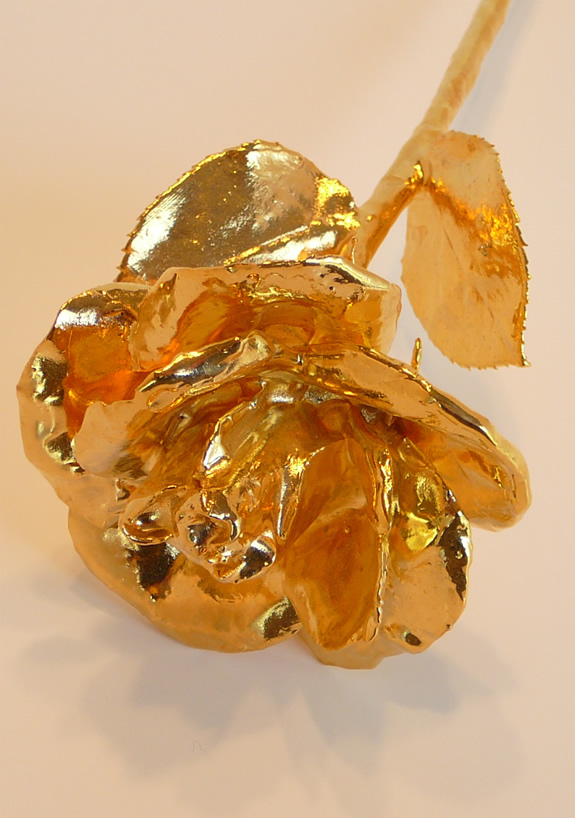
A rose dipped in 24-karat gold

Gold-dipped roses, or gold-trimmed roses, are real roses that are cut and preserved in a protective shell of gold to make them last a long time. These roses are often given as gifts on special occasions like Mother's Day, Valentine's Day, wedding anniversaries, birthdays, and other celebrations and events. The idea behind gold-dipped roses is to preserve the elegance and beauty of a rose forever in a metal that is just as exquisite and valuable as the rose itself, and to make a permanent and lasting expression of the emotions expressed by the giving of roses.

== History ==
The concept of gold-dipped roses has been around for quite a long time. However, the techniques of making a rose have improved, paying special attention to intricate details, so that all the features of a rose are enhanced, protected, and beautified. If the process of gold-dipping, the rose and the gold used are of good quality, the gold-dipped rose can be made to last a lifetime.

== Varieties ==
Other varieties of dipped roses include silver, platinum, and even tin roses. Petals, leaves, and rose orchids are also dipped in precious metals for preservation and decoration.

== Procedure ==
Different companies have different techniques and procedures for making gold-dipped roses, and most of the steps involved are patented by each company and are trade secrets. Dipping or plating a rose is a time-consuming and painstaking process that involves multiple steps and weeks to prepare the finished product.

=== Method ===
Some companies claim that it requires 60 steps and 3 months of delicate processing to make a gold-dipped rose, while others profess that it requires 30 days to make the end product. However, the basic procedure, especially for small-scale processing, is the same; a rose, grown especially for the purpose of dipping or plating, is cut and layered with lacquer or an electrophoresing chemical and then dipped in molten gold (or another metal) to make a hard shell of metal. At the commercial level, several companies use the process of electroplating the rose with gold for a more durable and professional look. Simplified steps of the process are as below:

1. A healthy and purpose-grown rose which is not yet fully bloomed is selected;
2. The rose is hand-painted or sprayed with lacquer or an electrophoresing chemical so that the metal will stick to it, and left to dry, which may take 24 hours;
3. The gold is melted, and the rose is dipped into it bud-first, holding the stem, for between 60 and 90 seconds, depending upon the desired thickness of the metal. If a light coating is required, it is dipped for less than 60 seconds; for a heavier coating, it is dipped for more than 90 seconds.
4. An alternative method, which is especially used for commercial processing, is complete electroplating of the rose first with metals such as copper, and then a final coating of gold.
5. The rose is left to dry until a hard shell is formed, which may take a couple of days, depending on factors such as wind and humidity.

The idea is to preserve the delicacy, features, and pattern of the rose so that it is evident even through the gold plating.

== Cost ==
Gold-dipped roses are available for anywhere between $69 and $299, depending on the technique and vendors, the karat of the gold that is used for dipping, and the thickness of the coating. Some cheaper roses are coated with tin and then lightly sprayed with gold of a lesser quality, like 10 karat. Good quality roses are dipped in 24K gold, and hence are expensive.
