= Roses (disambiguation) =

Roses are woody perennials of the genus Rosa.

Roses or Rose's may also refer to:

== In places ==
- Roses, Spain, in Catalonia

== In businesses ==
- Roses Stores, a discount store
- Roses Theatre, cinema/theatre/venue in Gloucestershire, England

== In food and drink ==
- Cadbury Roses, a confectionery
- Rose's (marmalade), a British marmalade owned by Premier Foods
- Rose's lime juice, a British concentrated drink

== In media, arts, and entertainment ==
- Roses (Krøyer), an 1893 painting by Danish painter P. S. Krøyer
- The Roses (film), a 2025 black comedy film

=== In music ===
==== Albums ====
- Roses (Cœur de pirate album), 2015
- Roses (The Cranberries album), 2012
- Roses (The Paperkites album), 2021
- Roses (Dragon album), 2014
- Roses (Kathy Mattea album), 2002

==== Songs ====
- "Roses" (Benny Blanco and Juice Wrld song), 2018
- "Roses" (The Chainsmokers song), 2015
- "Roses" (MacKenzie Bourg song), 2016
- "Roses" (Outkast song), 2004
- "Roses" (Saint Jhn song), 2016
- "Roses", by Adam Lambert from Velvet
- "Roses", by Angus & Julia Stone from Angus & Julia Stone
- "Roses", by BJ the Chicago Kid from 1123
- "Roses", by Carly Rae Jepsen from Emotion: Side B
- "Roses", by Cherry Ghost from Thirst for Romance
- "Roses", by Chris Brown from Heartbreak on a Full Moon
- "Roses", by dEUS from In a Bar, Under the Sea
- "Roses", by Haywoode from Arrival
- "Roses", by Jaehyun from J
- "Roses", by James Arthur from James Arthur
- "Roses", by Janis Ian from Aftertones
- "Roses", by Kaiser Chiefs from Education, Education, Education & War
- "Roses", by Kanye West from Late Registration
- "Roses", by Kelsea Ballerini from Unapologetically
- "Roses", by Laleh from Me and Simon
- "Roses", by Luke Christopher from TMRW
- "Roses", by Mary J. Blige from Growing Pains
- "Roses", by Men Without Hats from No Hats Beyond This Point
- "Roses", by Nas from Life Is Good
- "Roses", by Nik Kershaw from The Riddle
- "Roses", by Poets of the Fall from Carnival of Rust
- "Roses", by Seether from Holding Onto Strings Better Left to Fray
- "Roses", by Shawn Mendes from Illuminate
- "Roses", by Silverchair from Freak Show
- "Roses", by Stand Atlantic from Skinny Dipping
- "Roses/Lotus/Violet/Iris", by Hayley Williams from Petals for Armor
- "Roses", by Dick Haymes, single, 1950
- "Roses", by Jim Reeves from Moonlight and Roses, 1964
- "Roses", by Alyssa Reid, single, 2022

== In sports ==
- Roses Tournament, a sports tournament between York and Lancaster universities
- England national netball team, known as the Roses

== See also ==
- Roses Are Red
- Rose (disambiguation)
- Rozès, French commune
- Rozes (musician) (born 1993), American musician
