= ROSA =

Robotic surgical assistant

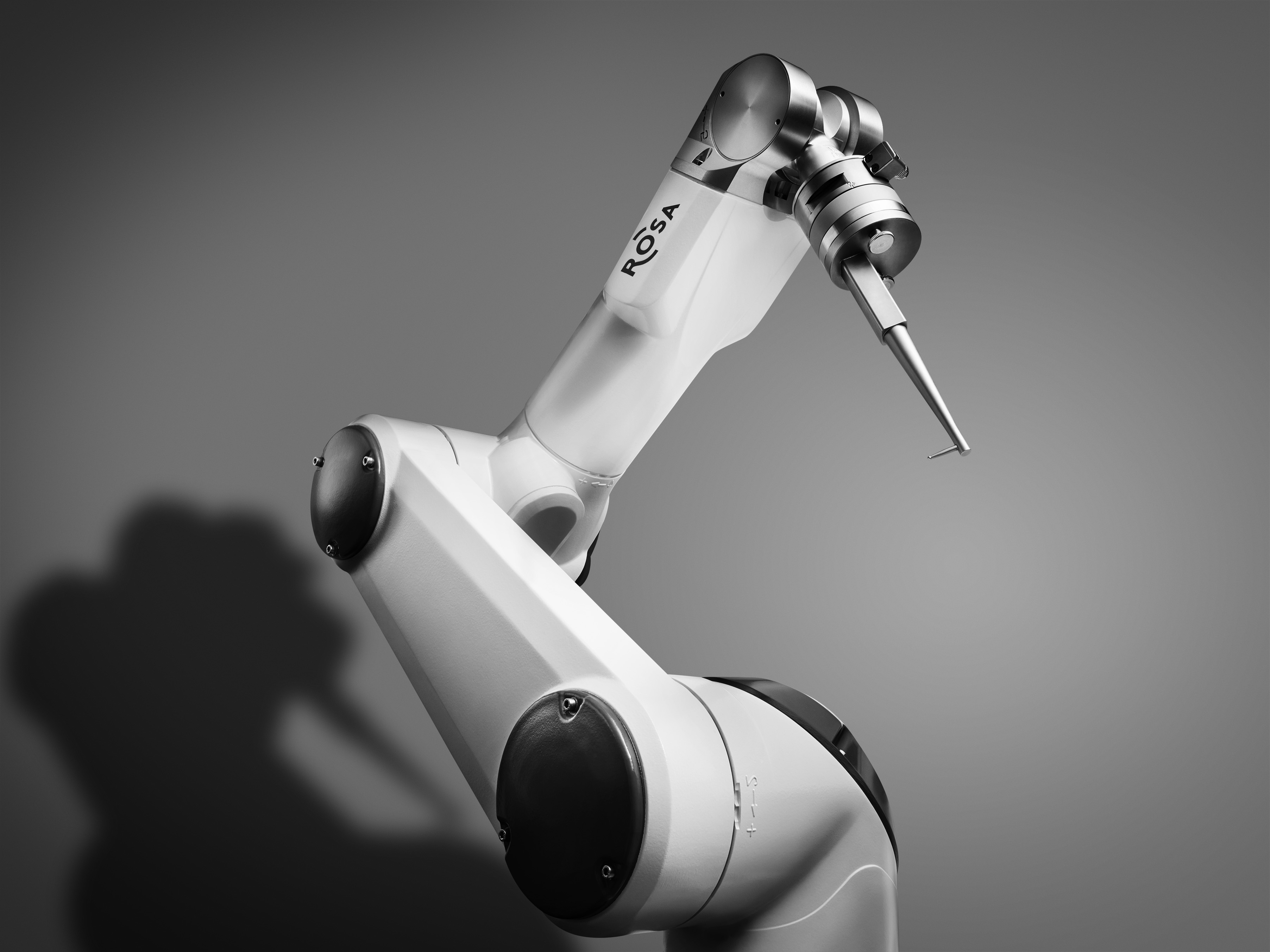
Arm of the ROSA One

ROSA is a medical robotic technology, designed to minimize invasiveness of surgeries of the central nervous system. ROSA robots assist health professionals during surgical procedures.

The ROSA technology, developed by the French company Zimmer Biomet Robotics, is used in 120 hospitals across Europe, North America, Asia, Australia, and the Middle East.

The device allows frameless stereotactic procedures increasing accuracy and reducing operative time. It is especially effective for SEEG, DBS, endoscopic procedures, brain tumor resection and pediatric surgery.

The ROSA device combines software for neurosurgical planning and navigation, with a robotic arm of high technology.
